This is a list of notable people best known by a stage name consisting of a single word.

This list does not include the many famous people who are commonly referred to by their surname (e.g., Liberace, Mantovani, Morrissey, Mozart, Shakespeare); it is quite common and regular for surnames to be used to identify historic and pop culture figures.

A

 Aamani (born 1973), Indian actress
 Aaradhna (born 1983), New Zealand singer-songwriter and record producer
 Aarathi (born 1954), Indian actress and producer
 Aarthi (born 1985), Indian actress and television host
 Abbas (born 1975), Indian actor
 Abdominal (born 1974), Canadian rapper
 Abhirami (born 1983), Indian actress
 Abigail, English singer 
 Above (born 1981), American street artist
 Abyale, French singer
 Abyss (born 1973), American wrestler
 Aceyalone (born 1970), American rapper
 Adamski (born 1967), English music producer
 Adassa (born 1987), American singer-songwriter
 Aderet (born 1976), Israeli entertainer
 Adeva (born 1960), American musician
 Adeyto (born 1976), French singer-songwriter, actress and director
 Adira (born 1991), Malaysian singer
 Adithyan (1954–2017), Indian film score and soundtrack composer 
 Aeone (born 1959), British singer-songwriter
 Afra (born 1980), Japanese beatboxer
 Afrob (born 1977), Italian-born German rapper
 Afrojack (born 1987), Dutch music producer and DJ
 Afroman (born 1974), American rapper and musician 
 Agallah (aka 8-Off, Swagallah; born 1974), American rapper and record producer
 Agha (1914–1992), Indian Bollywood actor
 Ahlam (born 1969), Arab singer
 Ai (born 1981), Japanese-American singer
 Aidonia (born 1981), Jamaican musician
 Aiko (born 1975), Japanese pop singer-songwriter
 Ailyn (born 1982), Spanish singer
 AiM (born 1975), Japanese voice actress and singer
 Aisha (born 1962), English singer
 Ajdar (born 1973), Turkish singer-songwriter
 Ajeesh, Indian singer
 Ajith (born 1971), Indian Tamil actor
 Ajoo (born 1990), South Korean singer
 AKA (1988–2023), South African rapper
 Akala (born 1983), British rap and hip hop artist
 Akam (born 1993), Canadian wrestler
 Akarova (1904–1999), Belgian dancer and choreographer
 Akhenaton (born 1968), French rapper and producer
 Akir, American hip hop artist and producer
 Akon (born 1973), Senegalese hip-hop artist
 Ákos (born 1968), Hungarian singer-songwriter
 Akrobatik (born 1974), American rapper
 Akufen (born 1966), Canadian electronic musician
 Alamgir (born 1955), Pakistani singer
 Alan (born 1973), Mexican actor and singer
 alan (born 1987), Chinese singer
 Alaska (born 1963), Spanish-Mexican singer
 Albela (1941–2004), Pakistani actor
 ALB (born 1979), French electro-pop musician
 Alberte (born 1963), Danish singer and actress
 Alesso (born 1991), Swedish DJ, record producer and musician
 Alex (born 1978), Danish singer, songwriter and actor
 Alexandra (1942–1969), German singer
 Alexia (born 1967), Italian singer
 Alexis (born 1968), German singer
 Alexis & Fido, Puerto Rican reggaeton duo
 Aleyn, English composer
 Alfio (born 1978), Italian-Australian singer-songwriter and musician
 Algérino, or L'Algérino (born 1980), French rapper of Algerian descent
 Ali (born 1967), Indian actor
 Ali (born 1975), French rapper 
 Ali (born 1984), South Korean singer
 Ali (born 1986), American wrestler
 Alias (1976–2018), American rapper, producer and record label founder 
 Alice (born 1954), Italian singer-songwriter and pianist
 Alişan (born 1976), Turkish singer and actor
 Alisha (born 1968), American singer
 Aliyah (born 1994), Canadian wrestler
 Alizée (born 1984), French singer
 Alloise (born 1984), Ukrainian singer
 Alonzo (born 1982), French hip hop artist and rapper
 Alpay (born 1935), Turkish singer
 Alsou (born 1983), Tatar Russian singer
 Alu, American singer-songwriter and musician
 Alyosha (born 1986), Ukrainian singer
 Alyth (born 1970), Scottish singer and actress
 Amadeus (born 1962), Italian presenter
 Amala (born 1968), Indian actress
 Amanda (born 1985), French-born Swedish singer
 Amandititita (born 1982), Mexican singer-songwriter
 Amar (born 1982), British-Indian singer
 Amarfis, Dominican singer-songwriter
 Amber (born 1970), Dutch-German singer-songwriter
 Ambika (born 1962), Indian actress
 A-Mei (aka A-mei, a-MEI, a MEI, Chang Hui-mei; born 1972), Taiwanese Puyuma singer-songwriter
 Amen (born 1972), Finnish guitarist
 Américo (born 1977), Chilean singer-songwriter
 Amerie (born 1980; aka Ameriie), American singer, songwriter, author, actress and record producer 
 Amidou (1935–2013), Moroccan actor
 Amil (born 1978), American rapper and singer
 Amine (born 1982), Moroccan-born French singer
 Aminé (born 1994), American rapper and singer
 Amoc (born 1984), Finnish rap musician
 Amoolya (born 1993), Indian actress 
 Anabela (born 1976), Portuguese singer and actress
 Anacani (born 1954), Mexican-born American singer
 Anagnorisis (born 1986), Russian-born German singer-songwriter and musician
 Anamor, Italian singer and actress
 Anari (born 1970), Spanish singer-songwriter
 Anasol (born 1976), Argentine-born Colombian pop singer
 Andrade (born 1989), Mexican wrestler
 Aneka (born 1954), Scottish singer
 Anelia (born 1982), Bulgarian singer
 Anémone (1950–2019), French actress, filmmaker and political activist
 Angel (born 1988), American singer
 Angel (born 1987), English singer-songwriter
Angel (born 1982), Mexican wrestler
 Angèle (born 1995), Belgian singer-songwriter and musician
 Angelica (born 1972), American singer
 Angélica (born 1973), Brazilian singer, actress and TV hostess
 Angelyne (born 1958), American model
 Anggun (born 1974), Indonesian singer-songwriter
 Angham (born 1972), Egyptian singer, record producer and actress
 Ania (born 1981), Polish singer and composer
 Aniki (1969–2018), American model and pornographic film actor
Animal (1960–2020), American wrestler
 Anita (born 1960), Austrian singer
 Anitta (born 1993), Brazilian singer, songwriter, actress, dancer and businesswoman
 Anjali (born 1982), Indian actress and model
 Anjani (born 1959), American singer-songwriter and pianist
 Anjulie (born 1983), Canadian singer-songwriter
 Anjuman (born 1955), Pakistani actress
 Anna (born 1987), Japanese-born American singer
 Annabella (1909–1996), French film actress
 Annabelle (born 1967), French singer and actress
 Annapurna (born 1948), Indian actress
 Annie (born 1977), Norwegian singer and DJ
 Anniela (born 1990), Swedish pop singer
 Annupamaa (born 1968), Indian singer
 Anodajay (born 1977), Canadian rapper
 Anouk (born 1975), Dutch singer
 Anoushka (born 1960), Egyptian singer
 Anquette (born 1972), American rapper
 Anri (born 1961), Japanese singer-songwriter
 Ant (born 1970), American hip hop producer
 Ant (born 1967), American comedian and actor
 Antoine (born 1944), French singer
 Antoinette (born 1970), American rapper
 Anuj, Indian-born Australian singer
 Anwar (born 1949), Indian singer
 Anza (born 1976), Japanese musician, singer and actress
 Aoife, Irish singer and composer
 Apache (1964-2010), American rapper
 Apathy (born 1979), American rapper and producer
 Apex (1981-2017), British musician 
 Aphrodite, British DJ and producer
 Apollo (born 1987), American wrestler
 Appa (born 1983), Dutch rapper
 Aqualung (born 1972), English singer-songwriter
 Arabesque (born 1981), Canadian rapper
 Aramary, Japanese singer and voice actress
 Aranza (born 1971), Mexican singer and TV presenter
 Arash (born 1977), Iranian-Swedish entertainer
 Arata (born 1974), Japanese actor
 Arcángel (born 1986), Puerto Rican singer-songwriter, rapper and actor
 Archana, Indian actress
 Aref (born 1941), Iranian singer
 Ares (born 1973), Norwegian singer and musician
 Argenis (born 1986), Mexican wrestler
 Aria (born 1979), American singer-songwriter and actress
 Aril (born 1985), Malaysian singer, actor, dancer and television host
 Arisa (born 1982), Italian singer
 Arletty (1898–1992), French model, singer, and actress
 Armand, singer 
 Arrow (1954–2010), West Indian singer-songwriter
 Aruray (born 1920), Filipina actress
 Arya (born 1980), Kerala-born Indian actor
 Aṣa (born 1982), Nigerian singer-songwriter
 Ásgeir (born 1992), Icelandic singer
 Ashanti (born 1980), American singer-songwriter
 Ashe (born 1993), American singer and songwriter
 Ashley (born 1975), Puerto Rican singer
 Asin (born 1985), Indian actress and dancer
 Aslyn (born 1980), American singer-songwriter
 Asmahan (1912–1944), Syrian singer, actress
 Assia (born 1973), French singer
 Assol (born 1993), Ukrainian singer
 Asspizza (born 1998), American fashion designer
 Astro (1957-2021) British rapper
 Asuka (born 1981), Japanese wrestler
 Asya (born 1965), Turkish singer-songwriter
 Ateed, German singer
 Atlantis (born 1962), Mexican wrestler
 Auburn (born 1989), American singer
 Aurora (born 1996), Norwegian singer-songwriter
 Averno (born 1977), Mexican wrestler
 Avicii (1989–2018), Swedish EDM DJ, remixer, and record producer
 Avra, Greek-Australian singer-songwriter, actress, dancer and producer
 Awie (born 1968), Malaysian singer, actor
 Awkwafina (born 1989), American actress, rapper
 Axel (born 1977), Argentine singer-songwriter
 Axwell (born 1977), Swedish DJ and record producer
 Ayaka (born 1987), Japanese singer-songwriter
 Ayana, Japanese singer-songwriter
 Ayane, Japanese singer
 Ayshea,(born 1948), English singer, actress and television presenter
 Ayọ (born 1980), German singer-songwriter
 AZ (born 1972), American rapper
 Azad (born 1974), Iranian-born German-Kurdish rapper
 Azekel, Nigerian-born British singer-songwriter, musician and producer
 Azis (born 1978), Bulgarian singer
 Azu (born 1981), Japanese singer
 Azuquita (1946–2022), Panamanian singer and composer

B

 Badshah (born 1984), Indian rapper
 B-Real (born 1970), American rapper
 Baauer (born 1989), American record producer 
 Baaziz (more detailed article in French) (born c. 1963), Algerian-born Berber singer 
 Babalu (1942–1998), Filipino actor and comedian
 Babatunde (born 1988), Polish wrestler
 Babydaddy (born 1976), American musician 
 Babyface (born 1958), American musician
 Bacchelli (born 1952), Spanish singer
 Bada (born 1980), South Korean singer
 Bahadoor (1930–2000), Indian comedian
 Bahamadia (born 1966), American hip hop artist, DJ, and emcee
 Bahamas (born 1981), Canadian musician
 Bahiano (born 1962), Argentine reggae singer
 Bakermat (born 1991), Dutch DJ and music producer
 Balvaz (born 1970), Norwegian musician
 Bangkay (1947–2018), Filipino actor
 Bapu (1933–2014), Indian film director 
 Barbara (1930–1997), French singer
 Barbette (1899–1973), American performer and trapeze artist
 Baron (1838–1920), French actor and singer
 Barzin, Canadian singer-songwriter
 Bashy (born 1985), British hip hop artist
 Basia (born 1954), Polish singer-songwriter and record producer 
 Basim (born 1992), Danish singer
 Basshunter (born 1984), Swedish singer-songwriter and producer
 Bassima (born 1973), Lebanese singer 
 Basto (born 1975), Belgian record producer, musician and DJ
 Batista (born 1969), American wrestler
 Battlecat (born 1968), American hip hop producer
 Bayianteras (1903–1985), Greek singer and composer
 Bayley (born 1989), American wrestler
 beabadoobee (born 2000), Filipino-British indie singer-songwriter
 Beans (born 1971), American hip hop artist and producer
 Beauregarde (born 1936), American wrestler and musician
 Beaver (1951–2010), New Zealand singer
 Bebe (born 1978), Spanish singer and actress
 Becca (born 1989), American singer-songwriter and guitarist
 Beck (born 1970), American musician
 Becky (born 1984), Japanese TV personality
 Bedders (born 1961), English musician, songwriter and composer
 Beefy (born 1985), American rapper and webcomic artist
 Beenzino (born 1987), South Korean rapper
 Belchior (born 1946), Brazilian singer and composer
 Belinda (born 1989), Spanish-born Mexican singer-songwriter and actress
 Belladonna (born 1981), American pornographic actress
 Belly (born 1984), Canadian rapper
 BélO (born 1979), Haitian singer-songwriter and musician
 Ben (born 1981), German singer-songwriter, occasional voice actor and TV host
 Ben (born 1991), South Korean singer
 Bénabar (born 1969), French singer-songwriter
 Bender (1980–2018), Canadian underground hip hop artist
 Bengü (born 1979), Turkish singer
 Beni (born 1986), Japanese singer-songwriter
 Bentot (1928–1986), Filipino comedian
 Benzino (born 1965), American hip hop artist, media executive, and record producer 
 Berri (born 1974), English singer
 Beth (born 1981), Spanish singer and actress
 Beto (1967–2010), Portuguese singer
 Betzaida (born 1981), American singer
 Bez (born 1964), English percussionist, dancer, media personality and comedian
 Bhavatharini (born 1976), Indian singer and music director
 Bhavya (born 1966), Indian actress
 Bïa (born 1967), Brazilian-born French singer
 Bibie (born 1957), Ghanaian singer
 Bigflo (born 1993), French rapper 
 Bilal (born 1983), Lebanese singer
 Biquardus, French composer
 Birdman (born 1969), American rapper
 Biyouna (born 1952), Algerian singer, dancer and actress
 Bizarre (born 1976), American hip hop artist
 Bizniz (born 1982), South Korean rapper and singer
 Blaaze (born 1975), Indian rap artist and singer
 Black (1962–2016), British singer-songwriter
 Bladee (born 1994), Swedish rapper
 Blanche (born 1999), Belgian singer
 Blaqstarr (born 1985), American rapper, singer, producer and DJ
 Bleubird, American rap artist
 Bligg (born 1976), Swiss rapper
 Blinky (born 1944), American singer
 Blowfly (born 1945), American singer-songwriter, comedian and rapper
 Blu (born 1983), American rapper
 Blueprint (born 1974), American rapper and hip hop producer
 Blumio (born 1985), Japanese-German rapper
 BoA (born 1986), South Korean pop singer
 Boa (born 1995), Chinese wrestler
 Bobbito (born 1967), American DJ and member of the Rock Steady Crew
 Bobby (born 1988), Bangladeshi film actress and producer
 Bobina (born 1982), Russian trance DJ, record producer and radio host
 Bocafloja (born 1978), Mexican MC and spoken word artist
 Bojoura (born 1947), Dutch singer
 Bombolo (1931–1987), Italian actor and comedian
 Bones (stylized as BONES; born 1994), American rapper
 Bono (born 1960), Irish singer-songwriter
 Bonvi (1941–1995), Italian comic book artist
 Booba (born 1976), French rapper
 Boondox (born 1975), American rapper
 Borgeous, American DJ and producer
 Borgore (born 1987), Israeli producer and DJ
 Boris (born 1965), French singer-songwriter
 Borlet, French composer
 Boss (born 1969), American rapper
 Bossman (born 1983), American rapper
 Bosson (born 1969), Swedish singer-songwriter
 Bourvil (1917–1970), French actor and singer
 Bowzer (born 1947), American singer
 Brädi (born 1979), Finnish hip hop artist
Bradshaw (born 1966), American wrestler and businessman
 Braguinha (1907–2006), Brazilian songwriter and singer
 Brahmanandam (born 1956), Indian actor and comedian
 Brainpower (born 1975), Belgium-born Dutch rapper
 Braintax (born 1973), British hip hop artist and producer
 Branco, Danish rapper 
 Brandy (born 1979), American singer and entertainer
 Brassaï (1899–1984), Hungarian photographer and filmmaker
 Braulio (born 1946), Spanish singer-songwriter
 Breakage (born 1982), British electronic producer and DJ  
 Breakbot (born 1981), French producer and DJ
 Brendon, British singer
 Bricktop (1894–1984), American dancer, jazz singer, and vaudevillian 
 Brisco (born 1983), American rapper
 Broery (1944–2000), Indonesian singer
 Brolle (born 1981), Swedish singer and musician
 Buckethead (born 1969), American musician
 Buckwheat (1931–1980), American child actor 
 Bukkcity (born 1980), Australian-born American rapper
 Busdriver (born 1978), American rapper
 Bushido (born 1978), German rapper
 Bussunda (1962–2006), Brazilian TV comedian
 Butterscotch (born 1985), American singer and pianist
 Byul (born 1983), South Korean singer
 Byz (born 1984), Swedish hip hop musician

C

 Cadenet (1160–1235), French-Spanish composer
 Cage (born 1973), American rapper
 Cali (born 1968), French singer-songwriter
 Calogero (born 1971), French singer 
 Calpurnio (1927–2022), Spanish comic artist and illustrator 
 Cam (born 1984), American singer
 Camané (born 1966), Portuguese singer
 Chameleone (born 1979), Ugandan DJ and AfroBeat artiste and musician reggae 
 Camelia (born 1974), Malaysian singer and model
 Camilla (born 1981), English singer and actress
 Camille (born 1978), French singer-songwriter and actress
 Camoflauge (1981–2003), American rapper
 Cam'ron (born 1976), American rapper
 Canardo (born 1984), French rapper, singer, songwriter and music producer
 Cancerbero (born 1977), Mexican wrestler
 Candice (born 1978), American model and wrestler
 Canibus (born 1974), Jamaican-born American rapper
 Cantinflas (1911–1993), Mexican comedian and actor
 Canuplin (1904–1979), Filipino actor, and comedian
 Caparezza (born 1973), Italian rapper
 Cappadonna (born 1968), American rapper
 Capucine (1928–1990), French actress
 Capulina (born 1927), Mexican comedy actor
 Caravelli (born 1930), French orchestra leader, composer and arranger
 Caribou (born 1978), Canadian musician
 Carlos (1943–2008), French entertainer
 Carlprit (born 1986), Zimbabwean rapper and actor
 Carmel (born 1958), British singer
 Carmella (born 1987), American cheerleader, dancer, fitness trainer, model and professional wrestler 
 Carminho (born 1984), Portuguese singer
 Carola (born 1966), Swedish singer
 Carpentras (1470–1548), French composer
 Carrara, Italian singer, composer and DJ
 Cartola (1908–1980), Brazilian singer and composer
 Cascarita (1920–1975), Cuban singer
 Case (born 1975), American singer
 Cashis (born 1978), American rapper
 Cassiane (born 1972), Brazilian singer
 Cassiano (1943–2021), Brazilian singer-songwriter and guitarist
 Cassidy (born 1982), American rapper
 Cassie (born 1986), American singer
 Castelloza, French composer
 Caushun (born 1977), American rapper
 Cazuza (1958–1990), Brazilian singer and composer
 Cazwell (born 1979), American rapper and songwriter
 Ceca (born 1973), Serbian singer
 Cecilia, Norwegian singer
 Cecilia (1948–1976), Spanish singer-songwriter
 Cecilia (born 1943), Chilean singer-songwriter
 Celeda, American singer and drag performer
 Ceo (born 1981), Swedish singer-songwriter and guitarist
 Cepillín (born 1946), Mexican television clown
 Cesaro (born 1980), Swiss wrestler
 Céu (born 1980), Brazilian singer-songwriter
 Ceui, Japanese singer-songwriter
 Ceza (born 1976), Turkish rapper
 Chacrinha (1917–1988), Brazilian TV host and comedian
 Chakri (born 1974), Indian music director and singer
 Chakuza (born 1981), Austrian rapper
 Chalam (1929–1989), Indian actor, comedian and director
 Chalice (born 1983), Estonian singer and rapper
 Cham (born 1977), Jamaican DJ, singer-songwriter and record producer
 Chamillionaire (born 1979), American rapper
 Chandrashekhar (1922–2021), Indian actor
 Chanyeol (born 1992), South Korean singer/rapper
 Chara (born 1968), Japanese singer, songwriter, musician and actress
 Charizma (1973–1993), American MC
 Charlene (born 1950), American singer
Charlotte (born 1986), American wrestler
 Charmion (1875–1949), American vaudeville trapeze artist and strongwoman 
 Charo (born 1951), Spanish-American entertainer
 Charuhasan (born 1930), Indian actor
 Charytín (born 1954), Saint Lucia-born Dominica-based singer and actress
 Chata (born 1979), Japanese singer
 Chaundon (born 1976), American hip-hop artist
 Chayanne (born 1968), Puerto Rican singer
 Cheek (born 1981), Finnish rapper
 Chen (born 1992), South Korean singer
 Chenoa (born 1975), Argentine-Spanish singer
 Cheran (born 1965), Indian actor and director
 Cherie (born 1984), French singer
 Cherrelle (born 1958), American singer
 Cheryl (born 1983), English singer, songwriter and television personality
 Chessman (born 1975), Mexican wrestler
 Chetes (born 1979), Mexican rock musician 
 Chezidek (born 1973), Jamaican singer
 Chiaki (born 1971), Japanese entertainer
 Chiara (born 1976), Maltese singer
 Chiara (born 1986), Italian singer
 Chicane (born 1971), British musician, composer and producer
 Chicháy (1918–1993), Filipino comedian
 Chikezie (born 1985), American singer
 Chilli (born 1971), American dancer, singer-songwriter, actress, and television personality
 Chingy (born 1980), American hip-hop artist
 Chinmayi (born 1984), Indian singer
 Chipmunk (born 1990), English rapper and singer-songwriter
 Chiquito (1932–1997), Filipino actor
 Chiranjeevi (born 1955), Indian actor
 Chisu (born 1982), Finnish singer-songwriter and producer
 Chitragupta (1917–1991), Indian composer
 Chloe, Australian singer-songwriter
 Cho (born 1993), Dutch rapper
 Choclair (born 1975), Canadian rapper
 Chocolat (born 1978), Japanese singer
 Choice, American rapper
 Chokoleit (1972–2019), Filipino comedian
 Choppa (born 1980), American rapper
 Chorão (1970–2013), Brazilian musician, singer, poet
 Chouchou, Lebanese comedian, stage actor, director
 Chrisanthos (1934–2005), Greek singer-songwriter
 Chrispa (born 1982), Greek singer
 Christell (born 1998), Chilean singer and musician
 Christian (1821–1889), French actor and singer 
 Christian (born 1949), Italian singer
 Christian (born 1973), Canadian professional wrestler 
 Christo (1935–2020), Bulgarian artist
 Christophe (born 1945), French singer-songwriter
 Christopher (born 1992), Danish singer
 Chrisye (1949–2007), Indonesian singer
 Chyna (1970–2016), American professional wrestler
 Chynna (1994–2020), American rapper, disc jockey, and model
 Ciara (born 1985), American singer
 Cibelle (born 1978), Brazilian performance artist, singer-songwriter and producer
 Cibernético (born 1975), Mexican wrestler
 Cicciolina (born 1951), Hungarian-Italian porn star, politician, and singer
 Cilvaringz (born 1979), Dutch rapper and hip hop producer
 Cindy & Bert (born 1948)/(1945–2012), German vocalists
 Cineplexx (born 1973), Argentine musician
 CKay, Nigerian singer
 Clairette (1919–2008), French-Canadian actress and singer
 Classified (born 1978), Canadian rapper
 Cláudya (born 1948), Brazilian singer
 Clemens (born 1979), Danish rapper, singer, music writer, actor
 Clémentine (born 1963), French singer-songwriter
 Cléo (born 1946), French singer
 Cleo (born 1983), Polish singer
 Cleo (born 1987), Swedish rap artist, singer and songwriter
 Cleo. (born 1988), English rapper and musician
 Cleopatra (aka Kleopátra; born 1963), Greek singer
 Clueso (born 1980), German singer-songwriter, rapper and producer
 CNU (born 1991), South Korean singer and actor
 Coba (born 1959), Japanese musician
 Cocco (born 1977), Japanese singer
 Coko (born 1970), American singer
 Colette (1873–1954), French novelist
 Colos (born 1981), Albanian-born German rapper
 Coluche (1944–1986), French comedian and actor
 Common (born 1972), American rapper and actor
 Conchita (born 1980), Finnish-born Spanish singer
 Consequence (born 1977), American rapper
 Coolio (born 1963), American rapper
 Coppé, Japanese singer-songwriter and music producer
 Copywrite (born 1978), American underground hip hop artist
 Corina, American singer
 Corina (born 1980), Romanian singer and composer
 Cormega (born 1973), American emcee rapper
 Corneille (born 1977), Canadian Rwandan singer
 Cornelius (born 1969), Japanese musician and producer
 Cougnut (1968–2001), American rapper
 Criolo (born 1975), Brazilian singer and rapper
 Cristie (born 1978), Spanish singer-songwriter
 Cro (born 1990), German rapper, singer, and producer
 Cronos (born 1963), English heavy metal singer and bass guitarist
 Crowbar (born 1974), American wrestler
 Csézy (born 1979), Hungarian singer
 Culture, Canadian rapper, reggae and hip hop artist
 Cupcakke (born 1997), American rapper
 Currensy (born 1981), American rapper
 Curse (born 1978), German hip hop artist
 Cybele (1887–1978), Greek actress
 Cytherea (born 1981), American pornographic actress and model

D

 DaBaby, American rapper
 Dabo, Japanese rapper
 Daboy (1952–2008), Filipino actor and producer
 Dadju (born 1991), French singer
 Dadoo (born 1976), French rapper
 Daedelus (born 1977), American record producer
 Daesung (born 1989), South Korean singer, MC and actor
 Daffney (born 1975), American wrestler
 Dagmar (1921–2001), American actress, model, and TV personality
 Dagmar (born 1955), Puerto Rican TV host, comedian, and singer
 Daigo (born 1978), Japanese singer-songwriter
 Dajim (born 1977), Thai hip-hop artist
 Daklon (born 1944), Israeli singer
 Dalia, Egyptian singer
 Dalida (1933–1987), Italo-French Egyptian-born singer and actress, diva
 Damae, German model, television presenter and singer-songwriter
 Damia (1889–1978), French singer and actress
 Damian (1964-2017), English musician and actor
 Damso (born 1992), Belgian-Congolese rapper, singer and songwriter
 Dana (born 1951), Irish singer
 Dana (born 1986), South Korean singer, dancer and pianist
 Danarto (1941–2018), Indonesian writer and artist
 Dan-e-o (born 1977), Canadian hip hop artist and actor
 D'Angelo (born 1974), American singer
 Dani (born 1945), French actress and singer
 Daniel (born 1955), Montenegro-born singer
 Daniel (born 1968), Brazilian singer
 Danny (born 1942), Finnish singer 
 Danny! (born 1983), American rapper and producer
 Danzel (born 1976), Belgian singer and musician
 Daphné (born 1974), French singer
 Dappy (born 1987), English-born Greek rapper, singer and actor
 Dara (born 1984), South Korean singer and actress
 Dara (born 1998), Bulgarian pop singer
 Darin (born 1987), Swedish singer
 Darina (born 1980), Mexican singer-songwriter
 Darine (born 1984), Lebanese-born Swedish singer-songwriter
 Darpan (1928–1980), Pakistani actor
 Darude (born 1975), Finnish trance producer and DJ
 Daryl (born 1955), magician
 Dataz (born 1984), Tanzanian rapper
 Daubray (1837–1892), French actor and operetta singer
 Dave (born 1944), Dutch-born French singer
 Dave (born 1998), British rapper, singer and songwriter
 Davina (born 1966), American singer and musician
 Dax (born 1969–1970), musician, producer, and music manager
 Daya (born 1998), American singer-songwriter
 Dead (1969–1991), Swedish vocalist
 Deadlee, rapper
 Deadmau5 (born 1981), record producer, DJ, musician, and composer
 Deakin (born 1978), singer and musician
 Dean (born 1992), South Korean singer, rapper, and record producer
 Dee, Canadian singer-songwriter, DJ, musician and producer
 Deeba (born 1947), Pakistani actress
 Deedar (born 1980), Pakistani actress
 Deemi (born 1980), American singer-songwriter and producer
 Deen (born 1982), Bosnia and Herzegovina singer
 Deetah (born 1976), Chilean rapper and singer
 Deeyah (born 1977), Norwegian singer, composer and filmmaker
 Defconn (born 1977), South Korean rapper, comedian and MC
 Delirious (born 1981), American wrestler
 Délizia (born 1952), Italian-Belgian singer
 Delkash (1924–2004), Iranian singer and actress
 Delta (born 1985), Mexican wrestler
 Dendemann (born 1974), German rapper
 Denyo (born 1977), German hip hop artist
 Désiré (1823–1873), French baritone, who created many comic roles for Offenbach
 Desireless (born 1952), French singer
 Des'ree (born 1968), British singer
 Dessa (born 1981), spoken word artist, author and MC
 Dev (born 1989), American singer
 Deva (born 1950), Indian composer and singer
 Devadarshini (born 1975), Indian actress and TV anchor
 Devayani (born 1974), Indian actress
 Devika (1943–2002), Indian actress
 Devon (born 1963), Canadian rapper
 Devon (born 1977), American pornographic actress
 Dexter (born 1973), Brazilian rapper
 D-Flame, German hip hop and reggae musician
 Dhamu, Indian actor and comedian
 Dhanush (born 1978), Indian actor and singer
 Dhany (born 1972), Italian singer-songwriter
 Dharan (born 1983), Indian composer and music director
 Dharmendra (born 1935), Indian actor
 Dharshana, Indian singer
 Diamond (born 1988), rapper
 Diana (born 1954), singer
 Diaz (born 1976), Norwegian rapper
 Dicte (born 1966), Danish musician and songwriter
 Dido (born 1971), British singer
 Diesel (born 1959), actor and wrestler
 Diganth (born 1983), Indian actor and model
 Dilana (born 1972), South African singer-songwriter and guitarist
 Dilba (born 1971), Turkish-born Swedish singer-songwriter of Kurdish origin
 Dilber (born 1958), Chinese singer
 Dileep (born 1968), Indian actor and producer
 Dilip (c. 1955–2012), Indian actor
 Dina (born 1956), Portuguese singer
 Dina (born 1985), Norwegian singer
 Dinio (born 1972), Cuban singer and pornographic actor
 Dino (born 1963), American DJ, singer-songwriter and record producer
 Dino (born 1948), Italian singer and actor
 Dio (1942–2010), heavy metal vocalist and songwriter
 Dion (born 1939), American singer-songwriter
 Diplo, American DJ, producer and songwriter
 Diverse, rapper
 Divine (1945–1988), transvestite actor
 Divino, Puerto Rican reggaeton artist
 Divyadarshini (born 1980), Indian actress and TV anchor
 Djavan (born 1949), Brazilian singer and composer
 DMX (1970–2021), American rapper and actor
 Dntel, electronic music artist
 Do (born 1981), Dutch singer
 Doda (born 1984), Polish singer
 Doddanna (born 1949), Indian actor
 Dodie (born 1995), British singer-songwriter
 Dolcenera (born 1977), Italian singer-songwriter
 Dolla (1987–2009), American rapper
 Dollarman, Grenada-born singer, songwriter, producer and musician
 Dolphy (1928–2012), Filipino actor and comedian
 Dominguinhos (born 1941), Brazilian singer and composer
 Domino (born 1970), American record producer and DJ
 Domino (born 1972), American rapper
 Dompan (1924–2008), Swedish jazz alto saxophonist and clarinetist 
 Donatello (born 1947), Italian singer
 Dondria (born 1987), American singer-songwriter
 Donghae (born 1986), South Korean singer and occasional actor
 Donovan (born 1946), Scottish singer-songwriter
 Dora (born 1966), Portuguese singer
 Doris (1947–2023), Swedish singer
 Dorismar (born 1975), Argentine model, actress, TV hostess and singer
 Dorlis (born 1982), Japanese musician
 Doro (born 1964), German singer-songwriter
 Dorothée (born 1953), French singer and TV presenter
 Doseone (born 1977), American emcee, artist and poet
 Dosseh (born 1985), French rapper and singer
 Dotan (born 1986), Dutch-Israeli singer-songwriter
 Dottsy (born 1963), American singer
 Double (born 1975), Japanese singer
 Doudrop (born 1991), Scottish wrestler
 Drake (born 1986), Canadian rapper and singer
 Drama (born 1981), rapper
 Dranem (1869–1935), French singer and actor
 Dregen (born 1973), Swedish musician
 Dres (born 1967), rapper
 Dresta (born 1971), American rapper
 Dru, Canadian singer-songwriter
 Drupi (born 1947), Italian pop-rock singer
 Dry (born 1977), French rapper of Congolese origin
 Dugazon (1746–1809), French actor
 Duilio (born 1973), Swiss singer
 Duke, English singer-songwriter and producer
 Dulce (born 1961), Filipina singer
 Dumbfoundead (born 1986), Argentine-born American rapper
 Duquende (born 1965), Spanish singer
 Dwele (born 1978), American singer-songwriter and record producer
 DyE, French musician
 Dyango (born 1940), Spanish musician
 Dynamo (born 1982), British magician
 Dev, Indian actor

E

 E (born 1963), American lead singer, songwriter, guitarist, keyboardist and drummer 
 Eamon (born 1984), American singer-songwriter
 Eartha, American singer-songwriter and musician
 Earthquake (born 1963), American actor and comedian
 Earthquake (1963–2006), Canadian sumōtori and professional wrestler 
 Ebi (born 1949), Iranian singer
 Edan (born 1978), American hip hop artist, emcee, DJ and record producer
 Edge (born 1973), Canadian actor, podcaster, and professional wrestler
 Edurne (born 1985), Spanish singer
 Edwin (born 1968), Canadian musician
 Eilera, French singer-songwriter and guitarist
 Eita (born 1982), Japanese actor
 Eivør (born 1983), Faroese singer
 Egardus, Flemish composer
 Ektor (born 1980), Puerto Rican singer and actor
 Elán (born 1983), Mexican singer-songwriter and pianist
 Elastinen (born 1981), Finnish rap musician
 Eldee (born 1977), Nigerian-American rapper and producer
 Electrico (born 1986), Mexican wrestler
 Electroshock (born 1970), Mexican wrestler
 Elektra (born 1970), American retired professional wrestling valet and professional wrestler 
 Eleni (aka Eleni Tzoka; born 1956), Polish singer 
 Eliana (born 1972), Brazilian TV hostess, actress and singer
 Elias (born 1987), American wrestler and musician
 Eliel (born 1981), Puerto Rican reggaeton producer
 Eligh, American emcee, songwriter and record producer
 Elisa (born 1977), Italian singer-songwriter
 Elisa (born 1989), Japanese singer and model
 Elissa (born 1972), Lebanese singer
 Elizângela (born 1954), Brazilian actress and former singer
 EliZe (born 1982), Dutch singer
 Ella (born 1966), Malaysian singer
 Elkie (born 1998), Hong Kong singer and actress
 Elodie (born 1990), Italian singer 
 Elpida (born 1950), Greek singer-songwriter
 Elvis (1935–1977), American singer
 eLZhi (born 1978), American rapper
 Emade (born 1981), Polish hip hop producer
 Emicida (born 1985), Brazilian rapper and songwriter
 Emii, American actress, pop recording artist, and martial artist
 Emilia (born 1978), Ethiopian-Swedish singer
 Emilia (born 1982), Bulgarian singer
 Emilio (1962–2016), American singer-songwriter
 Eminem (born 1972), American rapper, songwriter, record producer, record executive, and actor
 Emir (born 1980), Turkish pop singer
 Emma (born 1974), Welsh singer
 Emma (born 1989), Australian wrestler
 Emmanuel (born 1955), Mexican singer
 Emme (born 1963), American plus-size supermodel
 Emmi, Australian singer-songwriter
 Emmi (born 1979), Finnish singer-songwriter
 Emmy (born 1984), Armenian singer
 Emmy (1989–2011), Albanian singer
 Emyli (born 1988), Japanese singer
 Encore (born 1974), German singer
 Engelina (born 1978), Danish singer-songwriter
 Envy (born 1987), English rapper and MC
 Enya (born 1961), Irish musician
 Eon (1954–2009), British producer
 Epaksa (born 1954), South Korean singer
 Ephesto (born 1965), Mexican wrestler
 Erakah, New Zealand singer
 Ercandize (born 1981), German rapper
 Erfan (born 1983), Iranian rapper and producer
 Erik, British singer
 Erik  (born 1984), American wrestler
 Eru (born 1983), American singer, musician, and composer, based in South Korea
 Escoria (born 1980), Mexican wrestler
 Esham, American rapper
 Esmeray (1949–2002), Turkish singer
 Esquerita (1935–1986), American singer
 Esteban (born 1948), American singer 
 Estelle (born 1980), British singer, songwriter, rapper, record producer, and actress
 Esthero (born 1978), Canadian singer-songwriter
 Eternia, Canadian rapper
 Étienne (born 1971), Canadian singer
 Euforia (born 1974), Mexican wrestler
 Eugene (born 1981), South Korean singer and actress
 Eugene (born 1975), American wrestler and promoter
 Eunhyuk (born 1986), South Korean entertainer
 Euronymous (1968–1993), Norwegian guitarist
 Eve (born 1978), American rapper
Eve (born 1984), American actress and wrestler
 Everlast (born 1969), American rapper, singer, and songwriter
 Evidence (born 1976), American hip hop artist and producer
 Evil (born 1987), Japanese professional wrestler
 Evridiki (born 1968), Cypriot singer
 Example (born 1982), British rapper
 Excalibur, American wrestler
 Exile, American hip hop DJ, producer and rapper
 Excision (musician) (born 1986), Canadian producer and EDM DJ
 Extince (born 1967), Dutch rapper
 Eyedea (1981–2010), American rapper
 Ezinma (born 1991), American violinist, model music educator and film composer
 Ezkimo (1980–2015), Finnish hip-hop musician

F

 Faarooq (born 1958), American footballer and wrestler
 Fabian (born 1943), American singer and actor
 Fabio (born 1959), Italian fashion model
 Fabio (born 1965), British disc jockey and record producer
 Fabo (born 1983), American rapper and producer
 Fabolous (born 1977), American rapper
 Facundo (born 1978), Mexican TV host
 Fairuz sometimes Feyrouz or Fayrouz (born 1935), Lebanese singer
 Falco (1957–1998), Austrian singer, songwriter and rapper
 Falete (born 1978), Spanish singer
 Fallulah (born 1985), Danish singer-songwriter
 Falu, Indian-born American singer-songwriter
 Fanchon (1668–1743), French operatic soprano and celebrated beauty
 Fancy (born 1946), German singer
 Fandango (born 1983), American professional wrestler
 Fanfulla (1913–1971), Italian actor and comedian
 Fanny (born 1979), French singer
 Fantasia (born 1984), American singer
 Fargetta (born 1962), Italian DJ, producer and composer
 Farruko (born 1993), Puerto Rican reggaeton singer-songwriter
 Fashawn (born 1988), American rapper
 Fatlip (born 1969), American hip hop musician
 Faudel (born 1978), French singer
 Favorite (born 1986), German rapper
 Fawni (born 1985), Austrian singer-songwriter and actress
 Faylan, Japanese singer
 Feiticeira (born 1976), Brazilian model and TV personality
 Feloni, American rapper
 Fénix (born 1990), Mexican wrestler
 Fenriz (born 1971), Norwegian musician and songwriter
 Fergie (born 1975), American singer-songwriter
 Fernandel (1903–1971), French actor and singer
 Ferras (born 1982), American singer-songwriter
 Ferréz (born 1975), Brazilian rapper
 Ferron (born 1952), Canadian singer-songwriter
 Fey (born 1973), Mexican singer
 Feyrouz (1943–2016), Egyptian film child actress
 Fianso (born 1986), French rapper
 Fieldy (born 1969), American bass guitar player
 Fiend (born 1976), American rapper
Finlay (born 1958), Northern Irish professional wrestler
 Finneas (born 1997), American singer-songwriter
 Fiona (born 1961), American singer and actress
 Fiordaliso (born 1956), Italian singer
 Fish (born 1958), Scottish singer-songwriter and occasional actor 
 Fisz (born 1978), Polish rap artist
 Fiuk (born 1990), Brazilian singer-songwriter and actor
 Flash (born 1981), Mexican wrestler
 Flea (born 1962), Australian-born American musician
 Fler (born 1982), German rapper
 Flex (born 1980), Panamanian reggaeton artist
 Flor (born 1984), Argentine singer
 Florence (1749–1816), French actor
 Flume (born 1991), Australian record producer, musician and DJ 
 F'Murr (aka F'Murrr; 1946–2018), French cartoonist and comic book writer
 Fontaine (born 1979), American singer-songwriter and guitarist
 Fosforito (born 1932), Spanish singer
 Foxes (born 1989), British singer, songwriter and actress 
 Foxx (born 1984), American rapper
 Franco (born 1959), Cuban singer
 Frankee (born 1983), American singer
 Frankmusik (born 1985), English electropop musician, singer
 Frauenarzt (born 1978), German rapper
 Fredwreck (born 1972), American producer
 Free (born 1968), American rapper, singer and TV personality
 Freebo, American bassist, tubist, guitarist, singer-songwriter, and producer 
 Freeman (born 1972), Algerian-born French hip hop artist, actor and dancer
 Freeway (born 1977), American rapper
 Fréhel (1891–1951), French singer and actress (also aka Pervenche)
 Frenkie (born 1982), Bosnian rapper
 Fugative (born 1994), British hip hop and grime artist
 Funaki (born 1968), Japanese–American professional wrestler and color commentator 
 Future (born 1983), American rapper, singer, and producer

G

 Gaahl (born 1975), Norwegian singer
 Gabrielle (born 1969), English singer
 Gackt (born 1973), Japanese musician, songwriter and actor
 Gajala (born 1985), Indian actress
 Gala (born 1975), Italian singer-songwriter
 Galder (born 1976), Norwegian composer, musician and singer
 Gambi, French rapper and hip hop artist 
 Game (born 1979), American rapper
 Ganesh (born 1977), Indian actor
 Ganeshkar (born 1978), Tamil actor and comedian
 Garbo (born 1958), Italian singer-songwriter and record producer
 Garou (born 1972), Canadian singer
 Gauge (born 1980), American pornographic actress and former stripper
 Gazebo (born 1960), Italian singer and musician
 Gazo (born 1995), French rapper
 Geetha (born 1962), Indian actress
 Gemini, American rapper
 Genevieve (1920–2004), full name Ginette Marguerite Auger, American comedian, actress, and singer– 
 Genvieve (born1987), full name Genevieve Schatz, American indie pop singer 
 Geraldo (1904–1974), British bandleader
 Gerardo (born 1965), Ecuadorian rapper
 Gert and Daisy, British female comedy duo
 Ghali (born 1993), Italian rapper of Tunisian origin
 Ghantasala (1922–1974), Indian singer and composer
 Ghetto (born 1984), English grime artist
 Ginger (born 1964), Solo artist and also frontman for The Wildhearts
 Giggs (born 1981), British rapper
 Gigi (born 1974), Ethiopian singer
 Gilda (1961–1996), Argentine singer-songwriter
 Gilla (born 1950), Austrian singer
 Gilli (born 1992), Danish rapper and actor
 Gimma, Swiss rapper
 Ginger (born 1964), English guitarist and singer-songwriter
 Ginuwine (born 1970), American singer, songwriter, dancer and actor
 Giovanna (born 1945), Italian singer
 Girija (born 1969), Indian actress
 Gisburg (born 1966), Austrian singer
 Gisela (born 1979), Spanish singer
 Gisselle (born 1969), Puerto Rican singer
 Gloria (born 1951), Irish singer
 Gloria (born 1973), Bulgarian singer
 Glory, Puerto Rican singer
 Glukoza (born 1986), Russian singer
 Glykeria (born 1953), Greek singer
 Goapele (born 1977), American singer-songwriter
 Godsilla (born 1984), German rapper
 Göksel (born 1971), Turkish singer-songwriter and musician
 Goldberg (born 1966), American wrestler, actor, and football player
 Goldie (born 1965), English musician, DJ, visual artist and actor 
 GoldLink (born 1993), American rapper
 Goldust (born 1969), American professional wrestler
 Goldy (born 1969), American rapper
 Gombloh (1948–1988), Indonesian singer and songwriter
 Gonzaguinha (1945–1991), Brazilian singer and composer
 Gonzales (born 1972), Canadian musician
 Googoosh (born 1950), Iranian singer and actress
 Gopika (born 1984), Indian actress
 Gotye (born 1980), Belgium-born Australian multi-instrumentalist and singer-songwriter 
 Goundamani (born 1939), Indian film actor and comedian
 Governor (born 1972), American singer
 Govinda (born 1963), Indian actor
 Graciela (1915–2010), Cuban singer
 Gradur (born 1990), French-Congolese rapper 
 Grégoire (born 1979), French singer and composer
 Gretchen (born 1959), Brazilian singer
 Gribouille (1941–1968), French singer
 Griff (born 2001), English singer and songwriter
 Grimace, French composer
 Grimes (born 1988), Canadian musician and singer-songwriter
 Griot, Swiss rapper
 Gripsta, American rapper
 Grock (1880–1959), Swiss clown, composer and musician 
 Grooverider (born 1967), British DJ
 Gru (1973–2019), Serbian rapper, musician and DJ
 Guinga (born 1950), Brazilian composer and musician
 Gülşen (born 1976), Turkish singer-songwriter and model
 Gülseren (born 1973), Turkish-born French singer
 Gummy (born 1981), South Korean singer
 Guru (1966–2010), American rapper
 Gurukiran, Indian actor and music director
 GZA (born 1966), American rapper and songwriter

H

 H (born 1976), Welsh singer, dancer and stage actor 
 Hadise (born 1985), Belgian-born Turkish singer-songwriter, dancer and presenter
 Hafiz (born 1990), Malaysian singer
 Haha (born 1979), South Korean entertainer
 Haiducii (born 1977), Romanian musician, songwriter, model and actress
 Hakim (born 1962), Egyptian singer
 Hakimakli, French DJ
 Halloween (born 1971), Mexican wrestler
 Hallowicked (born 1981), American wrestler
 Halna (born 1980), Japanese singer
 Halsey (born 1994), American singer-songwriter
 Halston (1932–1990), American fashion designer
 Hamsalekha (born 1951), Indian music director and lyricist
 Hamuchtar (born 1971), Israeli singer, actor and director
 Hamza (born 1994), Belgian-Moroccan rapper, singer and beatmaker
 Hanayo (born 1970), Japanese musician and actress
 Hani (born 1992), South Korean singer and entertainer
 Hannah (born 1978), Australian singer-songwriter and musician
 Hariharan (born 1955), Indian singer
 Harini (born 1979), Indian film playback singer and classical singer
 Harisu (born 1975), South Korean transsexual/transgender singer, model, and actress
 Harper (1979–2020), American wrestler
 Harpo (born 1950), Swedish singer, musician and actor
 Harvey (born 1951), American radio and TV personality
 Harvey (aka MC Harvey, Harvey; born Michael Harvey Jr.), MC
 Haspop (born 1977), French stage director, choreographer and dancer
 Hatik (born 1992), French rapper and actor
Hawk (1957–2003), American wrestler 
 Hayden (born 1971), Canadian singer-songwriter
 Hayedeh (aka Haideh, Haydeh; 1942–1990), Iranian singer of Persian classical and pop music
 Haystak (born 1973), American rapper
 Haytana (born 1979), Ukrainian singer-songwriter
 Headliner (born 1967), American rapper and DJ
 Heath (born 1968), Japanese musician and singer-songwriter
 Heath (born 1983), American wrestler
 Heino (born 1938), German singer
 Heinrich, German singer-songwriter
 Heinz (1942–2000), German-born English bassist and singer
 Heklina, American actor, drag queen, and entrepreneur
 Helen (born 1939), Indian actress and dancer
 Hemlata (born 1954), Indian playback singer 
 Hergé (1907–1983), Belgian comics writer and artist
 Hero (born 1986), South Korean entertainer
 Hervé (1825–1892), French singer, composer and conductor
 Hervé (born 1980), British DJ and producer
 Hichkas (born 1985), Iranian rap artist
 hide (1964–1998), Japanese musician
 Hildegarde (1906–2005), American cabaret singer
 Himeka (born 1981), Canadian singer
 Hind (born 1979), Bahraini singer
 Histeria (born 1969), Mexican wrestler
 hitomi (born 1976), Japanese singer and songwriter
 Hizaki (stylized as HIZAKI; born 1979), Japanese musician
 Hoku (aka Hoku Ho Clements; born 1981), American musician, singer-songwriter and actress
 Homicide (born 1977), American wrestler
 Honoka (born 1983), Japanese actress, pornographic actress and TV personality
 Hooligan (born 1972), Mexican wrestler
 Hornswoggle (born 1986), American professional wrestler
 Horse (born 1958), Scottish singer-songwriter
 Houston (born 1969), American pornographic actress
 Houston (born 1983), American singer
 Hozier (born 1990), Irish singer-songwriter
 Huey (born 1988), American rapper
 Hümeyra (born 1947), Turkish actress and singer-songwriter
 Humph (1921–2008), English jazz musician and broadcaster 
 Hunterz, Pakistani-born English musician
 Hush (born 1972), American rap rock and hip hop artist
 Husna, Pakistani actress
 Hwanhee (born 1982), South Korean singer and actor
 Hwayobi (born 1982), South Korean singer
 Hyde (born 1969), Japanese singer and lyricist
 Hydra (aka Leslie Butterscotch), American wrestler
 Hyolyn (born 1990), South Korean singer-songwriter
 Hyoyeon (born 1989), South Korean entertainer
 Hyuna (born 1992), South Korean singer

I

 Icarus (born 1982), American wrestler
 Ichiro (born 1973), Japanese and American baseball player
 ICHIKO (born 1970), Japanese singer-songwriter
 Ichimaru (1906–1997), Japanese recording artist and geisha
 Iconiq (born 1984), Japanese singer, actress and MC
 Ida (born 1994), Danish singer
 Idaira (born 1985), Spanish singer
 Idha (born 1972), Swedish singer-songwriter
 Idir (1949–2020), Algerian musician
 Iftekhar (1922–1995), Indian actor
 Ihriel (born 1972), Norwegian musician and singer
 Ihsahn (born 1975), Norwegian composer, musician and singer
 Iiris (born 1991), Estonian singer, songwriter, and stage actress 
 iJustine (born 1984), American YouTube personality, host, actress and model
 Ilaiyaraaja (born 1943), Indian singer and composer
 Ilanit (born 1947), Israeli singer
 ili (born 1998), Scottish singer-songwriter
 iLLmacuLate (aka Illmaculate, Illmac; born 1986), Native American battle rapper and hip hop artist
 Illmind (born 1980), Filipino American hip hop producer
 Illy (born 1986), Australian rapper, singer, songwriter 
 Ilya (born 1986; known mononymously as ILYA), Swedish songwriter, producer and singer
 Ima (aka IMA; born 1978), Canadian singer
 Imaani (born 1972), English singer
 Iman (born 1955), Somali American supermodel
 Imani (born 1971), American rapper
 Imany (born 1979), Comores Islands Afro-soul singer
 Imposs (born 1980), Canadian rapper
 India (born 1977), American pornographic actress, singer and rap artist
 Indigo (born 1984), American actress
 Indila (born 1984), French singer
 Indio, Canadian singer-songwriter
 Indra (born 1967), French-Swedish singer
 Indrans (born 1957), Indian actor
 Inez (born 1977), Danish singer
 Infernus (born 1972), Norwegian black metal musician 
 Ingeborg (born 1966), Belgian singer and TV presenter
 Ingola (born 1973), Slovak singer
 Inna (born 1986), Romanian singer
 Innocent (born 1945), Indian actor
 Inoran (born 1970), Japanese musician and singer-songwriter
 Insooni (born 1957), South Korean singer
 Iota, Australian singer-songwriter, musician and actor
 Irene, South Korean singer, actress and television host
 Irma (born 1988), Cameroonian singer-songwriter
 Isgaard (born 1972), German singer
 iSH, Canadian singer, actor
 Ishtar (born 1968), Israeli-born French singer
 Islaja (born 1979), Finnish singer-songwriter and musician
 Isol (born 1972), Argentine singer
 Israel (born 1983), Filipino-born Australian singer
 IU (born 1993), South Korean singer-songwriter and actress
 Ivana (born 1969), Bulgarian singer
 Ivar  (born 1984), American wrestler
 Ivory (born 1961), American wrestler
 Ivy (born 1982), South Korean singer, model and occasional actress
 Iza (born 1995), Brazilian singer-songwriter and dancer

J

 Jacno (1957–2009), French musician
 Jacotin (d. 1529), Franco-Flemish singer and composer
 Jacynthe (born 1979), Canadian singer
 Jadakiss (born 1975), American rapper
 Jaddanbai (1892–1949), Indian singer, composer, actress and filmmaker
 Jaël (born 1979), Swiss singer-songwriter and guitarist
 Jagadish (born 1958), Indian actor
 Jagannathan (1938–2012), Indian actor
 Jagdeep (born 1939), Indian actor and comedian
 Jaggesh (born 1963), Indian actor, director, producer, and politician
 Jaheim (born 1978), American singer
 Jai (born 1985), Indian actor
 Jaibi (1943–1984), American singer-songwriter
 Jaidev (1919–1987), Indian composer
 Jaimeson, British musician, emcee, and producer 
 Jaishankar (1938–2000), Indian actor
 Jamala (born 1983), Ukrainian singer-songwriter and actress 
 Jamelão (1913–2008), Brazilian samba singer
 Jamelia (born 1981), British entertainer
 Jana (born 1980), American singer, songwriter, actress, author and philanthropist
 Janagaraj (born 1950), Indian comedian
 Janardhanan (born 1946), Malayalam film actor
 Jandek (born 1945), American musician
 Janita (born 1978), Finnish singer-songwriter
 Januarisman (born 1985), Indonesian singer-songwriter and musician
 Jão (born 1994), Brazilian singer-songwriter
 Jaqee (born 1977), Ugandan-Swedish musician
 Jaramar (born 1954), Mexican singer-songwriter
 Jarboe, American singer-songwriter and keyboardist
 Jasmine (born 1976), Finnish Romani singer
 Jasmine (born 1981), Chinese-born Taiwanese singer-songwriter and musician
 Jaya (born 1969), Filipino singer, record producer, TV hostess and actress
 Jayabharathi, Indian actress
 Jayachitra (born 1957), Indian actress
 Jayalalithaa (1948–2016), Indian actress and politician
 Jayamala, Indian actress
 Jayamalini (born 1948), Indian actress
 Jayan (1938–1980), Indian actor
 Jayant (1915–1975), Indian film actor
 Jayanthi (born 1950), Indian actress
 Jayasudha (born 1958), Indian actress-turned-politician
 Jayasurya (born 1978), Indian actor and mimicry artist
 Jazz (born 1973), American wrestler
 Jazzmun (born 1969), American actor and performer
 Jeanette (born 1951), English-born Spanish singer and actress
 Jędker (born 1977), Polish emcee 
 Jedward (born 1991), Irish singing and television presenting duo
 Jeet (born 1978), Indian actor
 Jeetendra (born 1942), Indian actor
 Jeeva (born 1952), Telugu actor
 Jeeva (1963–2007), Indian Tamil cinematographer and film director 
 Jeevan (born 1975), Indian actor
 Jehst (born 1979), English rapper
 Jem (born 1975), Welsh singer-songwriter
 Jenifer (born 1982), French singer
 Jennie (born 1996), South Korean singer
 Jentina (born 1984), British singer
 Jeremías (born 1973), British-born Venezuelan singer-songwriter
 Jeremih (born 1987), American singer-songwriter and producer
 Jero (born 1981), American-born Japanese singer
 Jessicka (born 1975), American singer-songwriter
 Jetta (born 1987), British wrestler
 Jewel (born 1974), American singer-songwriter, guitarist and actress
 Jewell (born 1968), American singer
 Jhene (born 1988), American singer
 J-Hope (born 1994), South Korean rapper
 Jibbs (born 1990), American rapper
 Jigsaw (born 1983), American wrestler
 Jiiva (born 1984), Tamil actor
 Jikki (1935–2004), Indian playback singer
 Jimena (born 1980), Mexican singer
 Jimeoin (born 1966), Irish-born Australian actor and comedian
 Jimilian (born 1994), Albanian-Danish singer
 Jimin (born 1995), South Korean singer 
 Jin (born 1982), Chinese American rapper
 Jin (born 1992), South Korean singer
 Jinny (born 1987), British wrestler
 Jippu (born 1985), Finnish pop singer
 Jiro (born 1972), Japanese musician
 Jisoo (born 1995), South Korean singer
 Jlin (born 1987), American electronic musician
 Joanna (born 1957), Brazilian singer
 Jobriath (1946–1983), American glam rock singer
 Jøden (born 1974), Danish rapper
 Joe (born 1973), American singer, songwriter and record producer
 Joelma (born 1974), Brazilian singer-songwriter and dancer
 Joeystarr (born 1967), French rapper
 Johnson (born 1979), Danish rapper
 JoJo (born 1990), American singer and songwriter
 JoJo (born 1994), American ring announcer, valet, professional wrestler and singer
 Joker (born 1983), American wrestler
 Jokeren (born 1973), Danish rapper and hip hop artist
 Jolens (born 1978), Filipino actress, recording artist, and television host
 Jomol (born 1982), Indian actress
 Jonah (born 1988), Australian wrestler
 Jonell, American singer
 Jonesmann, German rapper
 Jónsi (born 1975), Icelandic musician
 Jont (born 1973), British singer-songwriter
 Jorane (born 1975), Canadian singer and cellist
 Jordan (1955-2022), English model and actress
 Jordan (born 1978), English model
 Jordy (born 1988), French singer and musician
 Joselito (born 1943), Spanish singer and actor
 Joselo (1936–2013), Venezuelan actor and comedian
 Josenid (born 1998), Panamanian singer
 Joshiy, Indian film director
 Jovanotti (born 1966), Italian singer-songwriter and rapper
 Joy (born 1996), South Korean singer and actress
 Joya (born 1978), American singer
 Joyce (born 1948), Brazilian singer and composer
 J-Son (born 1985), Brazilian-Swedish singer
 JSX (rapper), French rapper
 Juanes (born 1972), Colombian singer-songwriter and guitarist
 Juanito, French singer 
 Jude (born 1969), American singer-songwriter
 Juju, Japanese singer
 Juju, Finnish rapper
 Jujubee (born 1984), American performer and TV personality
 Juka (born 1981), Japanese singer
 Jul, French rapper hip hop artist
 Juliette (1926–2017), Canadian singer and TV hostess
 Juliette (born 1989), Brazilian singer
 Jullie (born 1988), Brazilian singer-songwriter, model, actress and presenter
 Julyo (born 1978), Italian guitarist, songwriter, producer and DJ
 Jun (born 1983), Japanese visual kei rock musician and singer-songwriter 
 Jungah (born 1983), South Korean singer
 Jungkook (born 1997), South Korean singer
 Junjun (born 1988), Chinese-Japanese singer
 Juvelen (born 1976), Swedish electro-pop singer
 Juvenile (born 1975), American rapper
 Jyongri (born 1988), Japanese musician and singer-songwriter

K

 K.Maro (born 1980), Lebanese Canadian singer, record producer, entrepreneur
 Kafani (born 1981), American rapper
 Kahi (born 1982), South Korean singer-songwriter, dancer and choreographer
 Kai (born 1994), South Korean dancer, singer and model
 Kaitlyn (born 1986), American entrepreneur, bodybuilder, model, and professional wrestler
 Kajjanbai (aka "Miss Kajjan"; 1915–1945), Indian singer and actress
 Kajol (aka Kajol Devgan; born 1974), Indian actress
 Kakko (born 1969), Japanese actress, TV presenter and singer
 Kalaranjini (born 1962), Indian actor
 Kalel (born 1976), American Christian musician 
 Kalimba (born 1982), Mexican singer and actor
 Kaliopi (born 1966), Macedonian singer-songwriter
 Kalisto (born 1986), Mexican-American professional wrestler
 Kalomoira (born 1985), Greek-American singer
 Kalpana (1943–1979), Indian actress
 Kalpana (1946–2012), Indian actress
 Kalpana (1965-2016), Indian actress
 Kamahl (born 1934), Australian singer
 Kamala (born 1950), American wrestler
 Kamaliya (born 1977), Ukrainian musical performer, actress and model
 Kamelia (born 1971), Bulgarian singer
 Kam-Hill (1856 to 1935), French cabaret performer and singer
 Kamini (born 1979), French rapper
 Kana (born 1977), Finnish female rap musician
 Kanaka, Indian actress
 Kanchana (born 1939), Indian actress
 Kandi (born 1976), American singer-songwriter
 Kane (born 1967), American wrestler and actor
 Kangta (born 1979), South Korean singer
 Kano (born 1985), British rapper
 Kanon (born 1980), Japanese singer-songwriter and producer
 Kaoru (born 1969), Japanese wrestler
 Karan, Indian actor
 Karandash (1901–1983), Soviet clown
 Karina (Spanish singer) (born 1946), Spanish singer
 Karina (born 1968), Venezuelan singer-songwriter and actress
 Karolina, Israeli singer-songwriter
 Karpaga, Indian transsexual actress
 Karthik (born 1980), Indian singer
 Karunas (born 1970), Indian actor
 Karylle (born 1981), Filipina singer
 Kaskade (born 1971), American DJ, record producer and remixer 
 Kashinath (1951–2018), Indian actor, director, and filmmaker
 Kassia, Byzantine composer
 Kasthuri (born 1974), Indian actress and TV anchor
 Kathleen, Canadian singer
 Katman, Greek singer and TV personality
 Kato Kato (born 1981), Danish DJ
 Katsuni (born 1979), French pornographic actress
 Kausalya (born 1978), Indian actress
 Kavana (born 1977), English singer and actor
 Kaveri, Indian actress
 Kayah (born 1967), Polish singer-songwriter
 Kayahan (born 1949), singer-songwriter and musician
 Kayamar (born 1985), Hungarian singer, jazz and classical composer 
 Kaysha (born 1974), Congolese-born French rapper
 Kaytranada (born 1992), Haitian-Canadian electronic musician
 Kaze, American rapper
 Kazzer (born 1977), Canadian musician and TV personality
 K-Ci & JoJo (born 1969 & 1971, respectively), American R&B & soul duo 
 Kefee (1980–2014), Nigerian female gospel singer and composer
 Keith (born 1949), American singer
 Kehlani (born 1995), American singer
 Kelis (born 1979), American singer, songwriter and chef
 Kellee (born 1968), American electronica-house artist
 Kem (born 1969), American singer-songwriter and producer
 Ken (born 1968), Japanese guitarist
 Ken (born 1979), Swedish rap artist
 Kenna (born 1978), Ethiopian-American musician
 Kennedy (born 1972), American political satirist, radio personality, and former MTV VJ
 KENTA (born 1981), Japanese wrestler
 Kerli (born 1987), Estonian pop singer
 Kesha (aka Ke$ha; born 1987), American singer-songwriter, rapper and actress
 Kevinho (born 1998), Brazilian singer and songwriter
 Key (born 1991), South Korean singer, dancer, rapper, actor, recording artist, promotional model, radio host and MC
 Khaled (born 1960), Algerian musician
 Khalid (born 1998), American singer
 Khéops (born 1966), French DJ
 Khia (born 1977), American rapper, songwriter and producer
 Khosrovidukht, Armenian composer
 Khotan (born 1973), Mexican actor
 Khrysis, American hip hop producer
 Khujo (aka Khujo Goodie)
 Kiara (born 1963), Venezuelan singer, actress and TV presenter
 Kidd (born 1996), American rapper
 Kidd (sometimes stylized as KIDD; born 1989), Danish-Scottish rapper and hip hop artist
 Kiesza (born 1989), Canadian singer, instrumentalist
 Kiiara (born 1995), American singer and songwriter
 Kiki (1901–1953), French artists' model, nightclub singer, actress, and painter
 Killjoy (1966–2018), American musician; lead vocalist (Necrophagia)
 Kimbra (born 1990), New Zealand singer
 Kimera (born 1954), South Korean singer
 Kimeru (born 1980), Japanese musician, singer and actor
 Kina (born 1969), American musician
 Kipper, British musician
 Kira (born 1977), Belgian singer and model
 Kira (born 1978), German singer-songwriter
 Kirito, Japanese singer
 Kirka (1950–2007), Finnish musician
 Kish, 
 Kishore, Indian actor
 Kissey (born 1982), singer, songwriter, producer and performer
 Kitarō (born 1953), Japanese New Age musician
 Kitkat (born 1984), Filipino singer, actress and comedian
 Kiyoharu (born 1968), Japanese singer-songwriter
 Kizzy (born 1979), Dutch actress, singer-songwriter and TV personality
 Klaha, Japanese singer
 Klashnekoff (born 1975), British rapper
 Klayton (born 1970), American musician and record producer
 Klopfer (born 1980), German writer
 K'Maro (born ), Lebanese-Canadian rapper
 K'naan (born 1978), Somali-Canadian poet, rapper, and musician
 Knobody, American record producer
 Knox (born 1945), British singer-songwriter and guitarist
 Kohndo (born 1975), French rapper and producer
 Kokane (born 1969), American rapper and singer
 Kokia (born 1976), Japanese singer-songwriter and producer
 Kollegah (born 1984), German rapper
 Konnan (born 1964), Cuban wrestler and rapper
 Konnor (born 1980), American professional wrestler
 k-os (born 1972), Canadian rapper, singer, producer
 Kotoko (born 1980), Japanese singer-songwriter
 Koushik, Canadian musician
 Kovas (born 1984), American songwriter, record producer and recording artist
 Koxie (born 1977), French singer of Tunisian origin
 Koyuki (born 1976), Japanese model and actress
 Közi (born 1972), Japanese musician
 Kramer, American musician and record producer
 Krazy, American rapper
 Kraus, New Zealand musician and composer
 Kreayshawn (born 1989), American rapper
 Kreskin (born 1935), American magician
 Kreva (born 1976), Japanese hip hop MC and producer
 Kris (born 1990), Canadian-Chinese singer and actor
 Krisdayanti (born 1975), Indonesian singer and actress
 Krishna (born 1943), Indian actor
 Krishnaveni (born 1924), Indian actress, singer and producer
 Kristina (born 1987), Slovak singer
 Krohme (born 1980), American hip hop MC and producer
 Kshetrayya (1600–1680), Indian composer
 KSI (born 1993), British YouTube personality, amateur boxer, comedian and actor
 Kujira (born 1961), Japanese voice actress 
 Kūkahi (born 1999), Hawaiian singer-songwriter
 Kumar (born 1984), Cuban rapper
 Kunchacko (1912–1984), Indian producer and director
 Kurious (aka Kurious Jorge), American hip hop artist
 Kuroneko, Japanese singer
 Kurupt (born 1972), American rapper
 Kushida (born 1983), Japanese wrestler
 Kwes (born 1987), English record producer, songwriter and musician
 Kyla (born 1981), Filipino R&B singer-songwriter and occasional actress 
 Kylee (born 1994), Japanese singer
 Kyo (born 1976), Japanese singer-songwriter and producer
 Kyouka (born 1999), Japanese businesswoman, television personality, and former singer
 Kyper, American rapper
 Kyuhyun (born 1988), South Korean singer, dancer, actor and model
 Kyulkyung (born 1998), Chinese singer

L

 L (born 1992), South Korean singer and actor
 Lââm (born 1971), French singer
 Laava (born 1983), Brazilian singer
 Labrinth (born 1989), English singer-songwriter and producer
 Lacey (born 1983), American wrestler
 Lach, American musician and songwriter
 LaChanze (born 1961), American actress, singer, and dancer 
 Lachi, American visually impaired musician
 Ladyhawke (born 1979), New Zealand singer-songwriter and musician
 Lagbaja, Nigerian Afrobeat musician, singer and songwriter
 Lahannya, British singer-songwriter, performer and DJ
 Lakshmi (born 1952), Indian actress
 Lal (born 1958), Indian director and actor
 Lalaine (born 1987), American actress
 Laleh (born 1982), Iranian-born Swedish singer-songwriter
 L'Algérino (born 1981), French rapper of Algerian descent
 Lana (born 1985), American wrestler
 Laraaji (born 1943), American musician
 Larry (born 1998), French rapper
 Larusso (born 1979), French singer
 Lasairfhíona, Irish singer-songwriter
 Late, British rapper
 Lateef (born 1974), American hip hop artist
 Latifa (born 1968), Tunisian singer
 Latino (born 1973), Brazilian singer
 Lauv (born 1994), American singer, songwriter and record producer
 Lawrence (born 1961), English singer, songwriter, and guitarist
 Lay (born 1991), Chinese singer
 Laya, Indian actress and dancer
 Lazee (born 1985), Swedish rapper
 LE (born 1991), South Korean rapper, songwriter and composer 
 Lebleba (born 1945), Egyptian Armenian film actress and entertainer
 Lecca, Japanese singer-songwriter
 Lecrae (born 1980), American Christian rapper
 Leeteuk (born 1983), South Korean singer and presenter
 Lehri (1929–2012), Pakistani actor and comedian
 Leif (born 1989), American rapper
 Lekain (1728–1778), French actor
 Leki (born 1978), Congolese-Belgian R&B artist
 Lele (1986–2010), Puerto Rican rapper
 Lemar (born 1978), English singer-songwriter
 Lemmy (1945–2015), English musician, bass guitarist, and singer-songwriter 
 Lena (born 1991), German singer-songwriter
 Lena, Indian actress
 Lenine (born 1959), Brazilian singer-songwriter
 Lenka (born 1978), Australian TV actress, musician and singer-songwriter
 Leon (born 1962), American actor and singer
 Leon (born 1969), German singer
 Léonce (1823–1900), French comic actor and singer
 Léonin (d. 1201), French composer
 Leslie (born 1985), French singer
 Letrux (born 1982), Brazilian singer-songwriter
 Lexa (born 1995), Brazilian singer-songwriter and dancer
 Lexy (born 1979), Korean singer and rapper
 Leyona (born 1977), Japanese singer-songwriter
 Lia, Japanese singer-songwriter
 Life, British rapper
 Ligalize (born 1977), Russian hip hop artist
 Ligero, British wrestler
 Lights (born 1987), Canadian singer-songwriter and musician
 Lilimar (born 2000), Venezuelan actress
 Limahl (born 1958), British singer
 Limenius, Athenian musician and composer
 Liminha (born 1951), Brazilian musician and producer
 Lina, American singer-songwriter
 Linda (born 1977), Russian singer-songwriter
 Liniker (born 1995), Brazilian singer-songwriter
 Lio (born 1962), Portuguese-born Belgian singer and actress
 Lior (born 1976), Israeli-born Australian singer-songwriter
 Liroy (born 1971), Polish rapper
 Lisa (born 1974), Japanese-Colombian singer and producer
 LiSA (born 1987), Japanese singer-songwriter
 Lisa (born 1997), French dancer, actress and singer
 Lisa (born 1997), Thai rapper and singer
 Lissette (born 1949), Peruvian-born Cuban singer-songwriter and record producer
 Lita (born 1975), American singer and professional wrestler
 Lizy (born 1967), Indian actress
 Lizzo (born 1988), American rapper and singer-songwriter
 Lobão (born 1957), Brazilian singer-songwriter and TV host
 Lobo (born 1943), American singer-songwriter
 Lobo (born 1975), American wrestler
 L.O.C. (born 1979), Danish rapper
 Logic (born 1990), American rapper and singer
 Lole y Manuel (1954/1948–2015), Spanish Romani flamenco artists
 Lolita (1931–2010), Austrian singer
 Lolita (1950–1986), Italian singer
 Lolly (born 1977), British singer, TV presenter and actress
 Lomepal (born 1991), French rapper and singer
 Lonyo, British producer and MC
 Loona (born 1974), Dutch singer-songwriter and dancer
 Loquillo (born 1961), Spanish singer
 Lora (born 1982), Romanian singer
 Lorde (born 1996), New Zealand singer-songwriter and record producer
 Loredana (1924–2016), Italian actress
 Loreen (born 1983), Swedish singer and music producer
 Lorena (born 1986), Spanish singer
 Lorie (born 1982), French singer-songwriter and actress
 Loriot (born 1923), German humorist, film director and actor
 Lorna (born 1983), Panamanian rapper and reggaeton artist
 Lou (born 1963), German singer
 Louiselle (born 1946), Italian singer
 Louison (1668-after 1692), French operatic soprano and celebrity
 Lovefoxxx (born 1984), Brazilian singer
 Lovefreekz, British producer and remixer
 Lowkey (born 1986), British musician, poet and playwright
 Luba (born 1958), Canadian singer-songwriter and musician
 Luce (born 1990), French singer-songwriter
 Lucenzo (born 1983), Portuguese-French singer-songwriter, and producer
 Lucero (born 1969), Mexican singer and actress, formerly known as Lucerito
 Lucía (born 1964), Spanish singer
 Luciano (born 1964), Jamaican singer-songwriter
 Lucrecia, Spanish-Cuban singer
 Ludacris (born 1977), American rapper
 Ludmilla (born 1995), Brazilian singer-songwriter
 Luenell (born 1959), American comedian and actress
 Luhan (born 1990), Chinese singer and actor
 Luka (born 1979), Brazilian singer and songwriter
 Lula (born 1973), German singer and songwriter
 Lulu (born 1948), Scottish singer-songwriter and actress
 Lumidee (born 1984), American singer-songwriter and rapper
 Lunna (born 1960), Puerto Rican singer
 Lura (born 1975), Portuguese singer and musician
 Lydia (born 1980), Spanish singer
 Lyn (born 1981), South Korean singer
 Lynn (born 1992), Japanese voice actress
 Lyrian (born 1985), Italian-born Japanese singer
 Lyrik, Israeli music producer, dancer and singer

M

 -M- (born 1971), French musician guitarist
 MAA, previously known as Mar, Japanese singer-songwriter, former television host and model
 Mac (born 1977), American rapper
 Macklemore (born 1983), American singer, rapper and musician
 Machito (1908?–1984), Cuban jazz musician
 Macromantics (born 1980), Australian hip hop artist
 Madeon (born 1994), French musician, DJ, producer and singer
 Madhavi (born 1962), Indian actress
 Madhoo (born 1972), Indian actress
 Madhu (born 1933), Indian actor
 Madhubala (1933–1969), Indian actress
 Madhumitha (born 1981), Indian actress
 Madhushree (born 1969), Indian singer
 Madita (born 1978), Austrian singer and actress
 Madlib (born 1973), American DJ, musician, rapper and producer
 Madusa (born 1964), American monster truck driver and former professional wrestler 
 Maes (born 1995), French rapper of Moroccan origin
 Maestro (born 1980), American producer, singer-songwriter and rapper
 Maestro (born 1968), Canadian rapper, record producer, and actor 
 Maggot (born 1976), British rapper
 Magic (born 1968), American rapper
 Magik (1978–2000), Polish rapper
 Magnet (born 1970), Norwegian singer-songwriter
 Magnifico (musician) (born 1965), Slovenian singer
 Magno (born 1984), Mexican wrestler
 Mahadevan (born 1961), Indian actor
 Mahasti (1946–2007), Iranian-American singer 
 Mahendran, Indian actor
 Mahlathini (1938–1999), South African singer
 Mahmood (born 1992),  Italian singer-songwriter
 Maía (born 1982), Colombian singer-songwriter
 Majdala, Lebanese singer
 Majid, Danish rapper of Moroccan-Berber origin
 Makano (born 1983), Panamanian singer
 Mākii (born 1987), Japanese musician and singer-songwriter
 Mako (1933–2006), Japanese-American actor, voice actor, and singer 
 MAKO (born 1986), Japanese female band member
 MakSim (born 1983), Russian female singer
 Mala (born 1939), Pakistani singer
 Malaika, American singer
 Malavika (born 1979), Indian actress
 Mallika, Indian actress
 Malú (born 1982), Spanish singer
 Maluma (born 1994), Colombian singer and songwriter
 Mammootty (born 1951), Indian actor
 Mamukkoya (born 1946), Indian comedian actor
 Mana, Japanese musician and fashion icon
 Manafest (born 1981), Canadian rapper
 Mandakini (born 1969), Indian actress
 Mandaryna (born 1978), Polish singer, dancer and actress
 Mandisa (born 1976), American singer
 Mando (born 1966), Greek singer-songwriter
 Mango (1954–2014), Italian singer-songwriter and musician
 Maniaco (born 1966), Mexican wrestler
 Manikuttan, Indian actor
 Manivannan, Indian actor and director
 Manjula (1951–1986), Indian actress
 Mankind (born 1965), American wrestler, actor and comedian
 Mano (born 1965), Indian singer
 Manobala (born 1960), Indian director and comedian actor
 Manorama (born 1943), Indian actress
 Manoush (born 1971), Dutch actress and singer-songwriter
 Manskee (born 1978), Filipino-American musician
 Mansoor (born 1995) Saudi Arabian wrestler
 Mansour (born 1971), Iranian singer, composer and actor
 Mantas (born 1961), English heavy metal guitarist
 Mantra, Indian actress
 Manya, Indian actress
 Maradja, French singer, songwriter and music producer
 Marce (born 1974), Colombian singer-songwriter
 Marcela (born 1971), Mexican professional wrestler
 Marčelo (born 1983), Serbian hip-hop artist and lyricist
 Marcha (born 1956), Dutch singer and TV presenter
 Mareko (born 1981), New Zealander rapper
 Margo (1917–1985), Mexican-American actress 
 Margo (born 1951), Irish singer
 marhy, Japanese singer-songwriter
 Maria, Danish singer and songwriter
 Maria (born 1982), Bulgarian pop-folk singer
 Maria (born 1987), Japanese singer and actress
 Mariama (born 1986), Sierra Leone-born German singer-songwriter
 Maribelle (born 1960), Dutch singer
 Marilou (born 1990), Canadian singer
 Marilú (1927–2023), Mexican singer and actress
 Marilyn (born 1962), Jamaica-born British pop singer and songwriter
 Marina (born 1985), Welsh singer-songwriter
 Marinella (born 1938), Greek singer
 Mario (born 1810), Italian operatic tenor
 Mario (born 1986), American R&B singer
 Mario (1810–1883), Italian operatic tenor
 Marisela (born 1966), American-Mexican singer
 Mariska (born 1979), Finnish rapper
 Marisol (born 1948), Spanish singer and actress
 Mariz, Filipina singer, actress and TV hostess
 Mariza (born 1973), Portuguese singer
 Marjo (born 1953), Canadian singer-songwriter
 Markoolio (born 1975), Swedish-Finnish entertainer
 Marlayne (born 1971), Dutch singer and presenter
 Marracash (born 1979), Italian rapper
 Mars (born 1954), Hong Kong actor, action director and stuntman
 Mars (born 1980), American rapper
 Marshmello (born 1992), American music producer and DJ
 Martika (born 1969), American singer-songwriter and actress 
 Martirio (born 1958), Spanish singer
 Marwan, Danish-Palestinian rapper
 Maryon (born 1987), French singer
 Maryse (born 1983), French Canadian actress, businesswoman, glamour model, professional wrestling manager, and former professional wrestler
 Marz, American rapper
 Marzieh (1924–2010), Persian traditional singer
 Masada, American wrestler
 Mase (aka Ma$e; born 1975), American rapper, songwriter and minister 
 Mashonda (born 1981), American singer
 Maskiri, Zimbabwean rapper
 Massari (born 1980), Lebanese Canadian R&B singer
 Massiel (born 1947), Spanish singer
 Massiv (born 1982), German rapper
 Matisyahu (born 1979), Jewish American reggae vocalist, beatboxer, and alternative rock musician 
 Maurane (1960–2018), Belgian singer and actress 
 Mavado (born 1981), Jamaican musician and DJ
 Max (born 1988), South Korean singer-songwriter and occasional actor
 Max (born 1992), American singer, songwriter, actor, dancer and model
 Maxi (born 1950), Irish DJ, actress and singer
 Maximo (born 1980), Mexican wrestler
 Maxwell (born 1973), American singer-songwriter and producer
 May (born 1982), South Korean singer-songwriter
 Maya (born 1975), South Korean singer
 Mayoori (d. 2005), Indian actress
 Maysa (1936–1977), Brazilian bossa nova singer
 Maysa (born 1966), American jazz singer
 MCA (1964–2012), American rapper, singer-songwriter, director and film distributor 
 Mcenroe, Canadian hip hop musician
 McG (born 1970), American film producer and director
 Mdot, American rapper and actor
 Medina (born 1982), Danish singer-songwriter
 Médine, French rapper
 Meechie, American singer
 MeeK (born 1971), Franco-English singer songwriter
 Meenakshi, Indian actress
 Meera (born 1976), Pakistani actress
 Meg (born 1980), Japanese singer-songwriter
 Megas (born 1945), Icelandic singer-songwriter
 Mehmood (1932–2004), Indian actor, director and producer
 Mehnaz (born 1958), Pakistani singer
 Meiko (born 1982), American singer-songwriter
 Meja (born 1969), Swedish composer and singer
 Melanie (born 1947), American singer-songwriter
 Melissa (born 1982), Lebanese singer
 Mell, Japanese singer-songwriter
 Melody (born 1977), Belgian singer
 Melody (born 1982), Japanese singer and TV hostess
 Melody (born 1990), Spanish singer
 Menaka, Indian actress
 Ménélik (born 1970), French rapper
 Menny (born 1983), Mexican singer-songwriter
 Mephisto (born 1968), Mexican wrestler
 Mercedes (born 1978), American rapper and singer
 Merche (born 1974), Spanish singer
 Merton, American musician and personality
 Merz, English musician and singer-songwriter
 Metis (born 1984), Japanese singer-songwriter
 Metro (born 1983), Mexican wrestler
 Micachu (born 1987), English singer-songwriter and producer
 Michal (born 1983), Polish singer
 Michele (born 1942), Italian singer
 Michelle (born 1972), German singer
 Michel'le (born 1970), American singer-songwriter
 Micky (born 1943), Spanish singer
 Micky (born 1986), South Korean singer-songwriter and occasional actor
 Mictlán (born 1982), Mexican wrestler
 Midori (born 1968), American pornographic actress
 Mietta (born 1969), Italian singer and actress
 Miguel (born 1985), American recording artist, songwriter and producer
 Miguelito (born 1999), Puerto Rican reggaeton artist
 Mika (born 1983), British singer
 Mikeyla, Swedish singer
 miKKa, Serbian musician
 Milan (1941–1971), Serbian-American musician
 Millie (born 1946), Jamaican singer-songwriter
 Milow (born 1981), Belgian singer-songwriter
 Milva (1939–2021), Italian singer, actress and TV personality
 Mim, British singer
 Mimosa (1960–2023), French humorous magician
 Mina (born 1940), Italian singer
 Mina (born 1993), German singer
 Minette (1767–1789), Haitian actress, singer and dancer
 Mink (born 1984), South Korean-born Japanese singer
 Minmi (born 1974), Japanese musician, singer-songwriter and producer
 Minmini (born 1970), Indian singer
 Minzy (born 1994), South Korean singer 
 Mirah (born 1974), American musician
 Mireille (1906–1996), French singer-songwriter and actress
 Mirela (born 1990), Spanish singer
 Miria, American singer-songwriter
 Miriam (born circa 1981), Mexican pre-operative transsexual
 Mirud, Albanian snger
 Mirusia (born 1985), Australian soprano
 Misha (born 1975), Slovak singer
 Mísia (born 1955), Portuguese singer
 Misia (born 1978), Japanese singer-songwriter and musician
 misono (born 1984), Japanese singer
 MIST (born 1992), British rapper
 Misterioso (born 1966), Mexican-American wrestler
 Místico (born 1982), Mexican wrestler
 Mistinguett (1875–1956), French singer
 Mitski (born 1990), Japanese-American singer
 Mitsou (born 1970), Canadian pop singer, businesswoman, television and radio host, and actress 
 Miúcha (born 1937), Brazilian singer and composer
 Miwa (born 1990), Japanese singer-songwriter, musician and radio DJ
 Miyavi (born 1981), Japanese entertainer
 Miz (born 1981), Japanese singer
 Mizchif (born 1976), Zimbabwean-born South African rapper
 MØ (born 1988), Danish singer, songwriter and record producer
 Moana (born 1961), New Zealand singer-songwriter and documentary maker
 Moby (born 1965), American musician
 Mocky (born 1974), Canadian musician, producer, songwriter and performer
 Moddi, Norwegian musician
 Mogol (born 1936), Italian music lyricist
 Mohan (born 1956), Indian actor
 Mohini, Indian actor
 Mohombi (born 1986), Swedish-Congolese R&B singer, songwriter
 Mokobé (born 1976), French-Malian rapper
 Mokona (born 1968), Japanese manga artist
 Molière (1622–1673), French playwright and actor
 Momo (born 1974), Japanese singer-songwriter
 Momus (born 1960), Scottish singer-songwriter
 Monguito (d. 2006), Cuban singer
 Monica (born 1980), American singer-songwriter and actress
 Monica (born 1987), Indian actress
 Monice (born 1989), Bosnian-born Austrian pop singer
 Monifah (born 1972), American singer-songwriter
 Mo'Nique (born 1967), American comedian and Academy Award-winning actress
 Monisha (1971–1992), Indian actress
 Montéhus (1872–1952), French singer-songwriter
 Montrouge (died 1903), a comic actor in French musical theatre
 Moomin (born 1972), Japanese reggae artist
 Moony (born 1980), Italian musician
 Moos (born 1974), French singer
 Morena (born 1984), Maltese singer
 Morgane (born 1975), Belgian singer
 Morlacchi (born 1846), Italian dancer and actor
 Moroccoblu (born 1979), Mexican singer-songwriter
 Morris (born 1976), Romanian singer and DJ

 Motilal (1910–1965), Indian actor
Motsu, Japanese rapper (Member of m.o.v.e.)

 MoZella (born 1981), singer-songwriter
 Mozez, Jamaican-born English singer-songwriter
 Mugihito (born 1944), Japanese voice actor
 Mugison (born 1976), Icelandic musician
 Muhin, Bangladeshi singer
 Muhsinah (born 1983), American singer-songwriter and producer
 Mukesh (1923–1976), Indian singer
 Mukesh (born 1957), Indian actor and producer
 Muki (born 1975), Israeli singer-songwriter, musician and rapper
 Mukkamala (1920–1987), Indian actor
 Mumtaj (born 1980), Indian actress
 Mumtaz (born 1947), Indian actress
 Muna, Nigerian hip hop artist and model
 Mundy (born 1976), Irish singer-songwriter
 Murali (1954–2009), Indian actor and author
 Murali (1964–2010), Indian actor
 Murcof (born 1970), Mexican musician and record producer
 Murphy (born 1988), Australian wrestler
 Muscles, Australian electronica musician
 Musidora (1889–1957), French actress
 Muska (born 1952), Finnish singer
 Mussum (1941–1994), Brazilian actor and musician
 Muzi (born 1991), South African musician and record producer
 Mxmtoon (born 2000), American singer-songwriter and YouTuber
 Mýa (born 1979), American singer
 Myco (born 1979), Japanese singer, voice actress and radio personality
 Mynavathi (1935–2012), Indian actress
 Mystic, American hip hop artist
 Mystikal (born 1970), American rapper and actor 
 Myztiko (born 1988), Canadian reggaeton producer

N

 Naama (born 1934), Tunisian singer
 Nabiha, Danish singer-songwriter and actress
 Nacho (born 1983), Venezuelan singer
 Nada (born 1953), Italian singer
 Nadeem (born 1941), Indian-born Pakistani actor
 Nadhiya (born 1966), Indian actress
 Nádine (born 1982), South African singer
 Nâdiya (born 1973), French singer
 Nagesh (1933–2009), Indian comedian and actor
 Nagma (born 1974), Indian actress
 Najee (born 1957), American jazz saxophonist and flautist
 Najim (born 1985), Algerian/French raï singer
 Nakul (born 1984), Indian actor and singer
 Naldo, Puerto Rican singer-songwriter and producer
 Naledge (born 1983), American rapper
 Namitha (born 1980), Indian actress
 Nana (born 1968), Ghanaian-born German rapper
 Nana (born 1983), Malaysian DJ, singer and actress
 Nana (born 1991), South Korean singer, actress, and model
 Nanao (born 1988), Japanese model and actress
 Nanda (born 1939), Indian actress
 Nanditha (born 1978), Indian singer
 Naomi (born 1987), American professional wrestler, actress, model, dancer, and singer
 Napoleon (born 1963), Indian actor
 Napoleon (born 1977), American rapper and motivational speaker
 Narain (born 1979), Indian actor
 Naresh (born 1960), Indian film actor, politician, and social activist 
 Nargis (1929–1981), Indian actress
 Nargis (born 1976), Pakistani actress
 Narsha (born 1981), South Korean singer and dancer
 Nas (born 1973), American rapper
 Nashad (1923–1981), Pakistani-Indian composer and music producer
 Nasri (born 1981), Canadian singer, songwriter and music producer
 Nassar (born 1958), Indian actor, producer, director, lyricist and singer
 Natalia (born 1980), Belgian singer
 Natalia (born 1982), Spanish singer
 Natalia (born 1983), Greek singer
 Natalie (born 1979), American singer-songwriter
 Natalise (born 1985), American singer-songwriter
 Natalya (born 1982), Canadian female wrestler
 Natassha (born 1981), Indian model and actress
 Nature (born 1972), American rapper
 Naushad (1919–2006), Indian musician and music director
 NAV (born 1989), Canadian rapper
 Navdeep (born 1980), Indian actor
 Nawal, Comorian musician
 Nayantara (born 1984), Indian actress
 Nayobe (born 1968), American singer
 Naza (born 1993), French rapper and singer of Congolese origin
 Necro (born 1976), American rapper, producer, actor and director
 Necrobutcher (born 1968), Norwegian musician
 Needlz, American hip hop producer and composer
 Neeli (born 1966), Pakistani actress
 Neja (born 1972), Italian singer
 Nek (born 1972), Italian singer-songwriter
 Nekfeu (born 1990), French-Greek rapper, actor and record producer
 Nelly (born 1974), American rapper
 Nelly (born 1949), Egyptian actress, singer, comedian, television personality
 Nely (born 1987), Puerto Rican reggaeton producer
 Nena (born 1960), German singer and actress
 Népal (1994–2019), French rapper and beatmaker
 Nerdkween, American singer-songwriter
 Nesli (born 1980), Italian rapper and producer
 Nesty (born 1973), Puerto Rican reggaeton producer
 Nevaeh (born 1986), American wrestler
 Neville (born 1986), English wrestler
 Newkid (born 1990), Swedish-Filipino rapper
 Neymar (born 1992), Brazilian footballer
 Ngaire, New Zealand singer
 Niarn (born 1979), Danish rapper
 Nichkhun (born 1988), American/Thai K-pop singer
 Nicki (born 1966), German singer and composer
 Nico (1938–1988), German model and singer-songwriter
 Nico (born 1970), Romanian singer
 Nicolay, Dutch hip hop musician
 Nicole (born 1964), German singer
 Nicole (born 1977), Chilean singer
 Nicoletta (born 1944), French singer
 Nicolette, British singer-songwriter
 Niello, Swedish rapper and electronic hip hop artist
 Nikki, Japanese-born American musician
 Nikki (born 1985), Malaysian singer
 Niklas (born 1983), Danish singer songwriter
 Nimmi (born 1933), Indian actress
 Nina (born 1966), Spanish singer and actress
 Nine (born 1969), American rapper
 Ninezero, Australian singer-songwriter and musician
 Ninho (born 1996), French-Congolese rapper 
 Ninja, English rapper
 Nino (born 1981), Greek singer-songwriter and musician
 Nirala (1937-1990), Pakistani comedian
 Niska (born 1994), French rapper
 Nitro, Mexican wrestler
 Nitti, American record producer
 Nitty (born 1977), American rapper
 Nivea (born 1982), American singer and songwriter
 Nneka (born 1980), Nigerian-German singer and songwriter
 Noa (born 1969), Israeli singer
 Node (born 1990), Danish singer and hip hop artist
 Nodesha (born 1985), American singer
 Noel, Puerto Rican singer
 Noelia (born 1977), Puerto Rican singer-songwriter
 Noemi (born 1982), Italian singer
 Noizy (born 1986), Albanian rapper
 Nokko (born 1963), Japanese singer-songwriter
 Nonchalant (born 1973), American singer, rapper and songwriter
 Noodles (born 1963), American guitarist
 Noor (born 1982), Pakistani actress and model
 Normani (born 1996), American singer
 Nornagest (born 1977), Belgian singer and musician
 Nour (born 1977), Lebanese actress
 Nourhanne (born 1977), Lebanese singer
 Novel (born 1981), American hip hop artist
 Noztra (born 1982), Dominican-born American musician
 Nucha (born 1966), Portuguese singer
 Nujabes, Japanese hip hop producer and DJ
 Numskull (born 1975), American rapper
 Nutan (1936–1991), Indian actress
 Nygma (born 1974), Mexican wrestler
nZo (born 1986), American rapper and wrestler

O

 Oceana (born 1982), German singer
 Octagón (born 1961), Mexican wrestler
 Octagóncito (born 1973), Mexican wrestler
 Octahvia, American singer
 Odetta (1930–2008), American singer-songwriter, actress, guitarist, and civil/human rights activist
 Offset (born 1991), American rapper
 Oforia (born 1971), Israeli electronic music artist and music producer
 Ogeday (born 1981), Turkish rap singer
 Ola (born 1986), Swedish singer
 Olamide (born 1989), Nigerian hip-hop artist
 Olímpico (born 1965), Mexican wrestler
 Oliver (1945–2000), American singer
 Olivia (born 1979), Japanese American singer-songwriter
 Olivia (born 1980), American singer
 Olunike (born 1977), Canadian actress
 Omarion (born 1984), American singer-songwriter, actor, dancer and producer
 Omarosa (born 1974), American television show participant and writer
 Omnionn, Salvadoran music producer
Omos (born 1994), Nigerian-American wrestler
 Onew (born 1989), singer, dancer, lyricist, presenter, radio host, MC and promotional model
 Onyx, American wrestler
 Opaque (born 1976), Norwegian rapper
 Oprah (born 1954), American actress and executive
 Orelsan (born 1982), French hip hop and rap artist
 Oreste (1923–1998), Maltese actor-singer, popular in "The Vagabond King"
 Orianthi (born 1985), Australian singer-songwriter and guitarist
 Origa (born 1970), Russian Japanese singer
 Oscarito (1906–1970), Brazilian actor and comedian
 Osez, Swiss rapper and dancer
 Otis (born 1991), American wrestler
 Outasight (born 1983), American singer-songwriter and rapper
 Outsider (born 1983), South Korean rapper
 Ovidie, French director, producer and pornographic actress

P

 Pacifico (born 1964), Italian singer-songwriter and composer
 Padmini (1932–2006), Indian actress
 Paige (born 1992), English wrestler
 Palito (1934–2010), Filipino actor
 Pampidoo, Jamaican musician, songwriter and DJ
 Panaiotis, American vocalist and composer
 Pandora (born 1970), Swedish eurodance artist
 Panti (born 1968), Irish performer
 Paperboy (born 1969), American rapper
 Papoose (born 1978), American rapper
 Paradime (born 1974), American hip hop singer and musician
 Parajanov (1924–1990), Soviet Armenian film director
 Paraluman (1923–2009), Filipino actress
 Paris (born 1967), American hip hop artist
 Parisa (born 1950), Iranian singer and musician
 PartyNextDoor (born 1993), Canadian rapper, singer, songwriter, and record producer
 Passenger (born 1984), British singer-songwriter and indie pop/folk/rock singer
 Passi (born 1972), French hip hop artist
 Pasupathy (born 1968), Indian actor
 Pata (born 1965), Japanese musician and songwriter
 Patachou (born 1918), French singer
 Patra (born 1972), Jamaican singer
 Patrizia, Italian-born Canadian singer
 Pauline (born 1988), French singer-songwriter
 Paulini (born 1982), Fijian-born Australian singer-songwriter and actress
 Peaches (born 1968), Canadian musician
 Pebbles (born 1964), American singer, songwriter and producer
 Pegasso (born 1978), Mexican wrestler
 Peirol, French composer
 Peja (born 1976), Polish rap musician, songwriter and producer
 Pelé (1940–2022), Brazilian footballer, occasional actor and singer-songwriter
 Perarasu, Indian director
 Perdigon, French composer
 Peret (born 1935), Spanish singer, musician and composer
 Perfect (born 1980), Jamaican singer
 Perla (born 1952), Paraguayan-Brazilian singer
 Perlla (born 1988), Brazilian singer
 Pérotin, European composer
 Pest (born 1975), Norwegian black metal vocalist 
 Peter (born 1952), Japanese singer, dancer and actor
 PewDiePie (born 1989), Swedish web-based comedian and producer
 Phew (born 1959), Japanese singer
 Philomina (1926–2006), Indian actress
 Photek (born 1972), British disc jockey and record producer
 Phranc (born 1952), American singer-songwriter
 Phyno (born 1986), Nigerian rapper and record producer
 Pianoman, British dance music producer
 Pierrot (born 1969), Hungarian singer-songwriter, music producer and game designer
 Pierrothito (born 1967), Mexican wrestler
 Pikotaro, Japanese entertainer and comedian
 Pinchers (born 1965), Jamaican singer
 Pink (born 1979), American singer-songwriter
 Piotta (born 1973), Italian hip hop musician
 Pitbull (born 1981), American rapper
 Pitof (born 1957), French film director
 Pitty (born 1977), Brazilian singer
 Pixinguinha (1897–1973), Brazilian composer and musician
 Plavka (born 1968), British-American singer
 Playalitical (born 1982), American rapper
 Plies (born 1976), American rapper
 Pliers (born 1963), Jamaican Reggae singer
 PLK, acronyme for Polak (born 1997), French rapper of mixed Polish and Corsican origin
 Plumb (born 1975), American musician
 Pocah (born 1994), Brazilian singer-songwriter
 Poe (born 1968), American singer-songwriter
 Pokwang (born 1970), Filipino comedian, and dramatic actress
 Polaire (1874–1939), Algerian-born French singer and actress
 Poldowski (1879–1932), Belgian-born British composer and pianist
 Pollyfilla (born 1978), New Zealand performer
 Pólvora (born 1979), Mexican wrestler
 Ponvannan (born 1964), Indian actor
 Pooh (born 1974), Filipino comedian
 Poorna, Indian actress and model
 Poornitha (born 1990), Indian actress
 Poppy (born 1995), American singer-songwriter
 Porta (born 1988), Spanish rap singer
 Povia (born 1972), Italian singer-songwriter
 Pras (born 1972), American rapper
 Prasanna (born 1982), Indian actor
 Predikador (born 1983), Panamanian producer
 Prema, Malaysian singer-songwriter and musician
 Premji (1908–1998), Indian actor
 Preslava (born 1984), Bulgarian singer
 Princessa, American rapper and singer
 Princessa (born 1975), Spanish singer
 Pritam, Indian composer and music director
 Priyamani (born 1984), Indian actress and model
 Promise (born 1982), Canadian rapper
 Promoe (born 1976), Swedish rapper
 Proof (1973–2006), American rapper
 Prozak (born 1977), American independent rapper and film director
 Psarantonis (born 1942), Greek singer-songwriter and musician
 Psicosis (born 1971), Mexican wrestler
 Psy (born 1977), South Korean entertainer
 Psychosiz (born 1984), American rapper
 Pugo (1910–1978), Filipino actor, comedian, director, and vaudevillian
 Pulsedriver (born 1974), German DJ and producer
 Puntillita (1921–2000), Cuban singer
 Pupo (born 1955), Italian singer and lyricist
 Pushead, American artist and writer
 Pushim (born 1975), Japanese reggae artist
 Pycard, European composer
 Pyranja (born 1978), German rapper

Q

 QBoy (born 1978), British rapper, producer, DJ, writer and presenter
 QT (born 1988), singer and performance artist
 Quavo (born 1991), American rapper, singer, and producer
 Questlove (born 1971), American drummer, DJ and record producer
 Quicksilver, American wrestler
 Quino (born 1932), Argentine cartoonist
 Qwel (born 1980), American underground rapper and author
 Qwote, Haitian American singer-songwriter; club, pop, R&B, electronic and urban artist

R

 Raaghav (born 1974), Indian actor
 Raakhee (born 1947), Indian actress
 Raasi, Indian actress
 Rachel, French singer
 Radha (born 1965), Indian actress
 Radioinactive, American rapper
 Raekwon (born 1970), American rapper
 Raf (born 1959), Italian singer-songwriter
 Raffi (born 1948), Canadian singer-songwriter
 Raghav (born 1981), Canadian singer-songwriter
 Raghuvaran (1954–2008), Indian actor
 Ragini (1937–1976), Indian danseuse and actress
 Rahzel (born 1964), American hip-hop artist
 Raimu (1883–1946), French actor
 Rain (born 1982), South Korean entertainer
 Raja (born 1978), Indian actor
 Rajesh (born 1949), Indian actor
 Rajinikanth (born 1950), Indian actor
 Rajkiran (born 1954), Indian actor, producer and director
 Rajkumar (1929–2006), Indian actor and singer
 Rakim (born 1968), American rapper
 Rakshita (born 1984), Indian actress
 Ramarajan (born 1960), Indian actor
 Rambha (born 1976), Indian actress
 Rammellzee (1960–2010), American performance artist and hip-hop musician
 Ramón (born 1985), Spanish singer-songwriter
 Ramona (1909–1972), American singer and pianist
 Ramya (born 1982), Indian actress
 Rani (1946–1993), Pakistani actress
 Ranjitha (born 1975), Indian film and television actress
 Raphael (born 1943), Spanish singer and actor
 Raptile (born 1976), German rapper, producer and songwriter
 Rasco (born 1970), American rapper
 Rasel (born 1981), Spanish singer
 Rasheeda (born 1982), American rapper
 Rasta (born 1963), American football player and actor
 Ratheesh (1954–2002), Indian actor
 Ratsy (born 1994), American folk singer-songwriter
 Raven (born 1964), American wrestler and occasional actor
 Raven (born 1979), American performer and TV personality
 Ravi (1926–2012), Indian music director
 Ravi (born 1976), Norwegian artist, musician, vocalist, composer, journalist
 Ravichandran (d. 2011), Tamil actor
 Raylene (born 1977), American pornographic actress
 Raymzter (born 1979), Dutch rapper
 Rayvon (born 1970), Barbadian singer
 Raziel (born 1973), Mexican wrestler
 Razzle (1960–1984), British drummer
 Reba (born 1955), American singer
 Redman (born 1970), American rapper, producer and actor
 RedOne (born 1972), Moroccan-Swedish-American producer, songwriter and music executive
 Reina (born 1978), American singer-songwriter
 Rekha (born 1970), Indian Tamil actress
 Rekha (born 1954), Malayalam film actress
 Rell (born 1976), singer and songwriter
 Remady (born 1977), Swiss music producer 
 Remedy (born 1972), American emcee and hip hop producer
 Renaud (born 1952), French singer-songwriter and actor
 Res, American singer
 Resham (born 1976), Pakistani actress
 Reshma (born 1947), Pakistani singer
 Retta (born 1970), American actress and stand-up comedienne
 Revathi (born 1966), Indian actress and director
 Reyash (born 1974), Polish musician and singer
 Reyli (born 1972), Mexican singer-songwriter
 Reynaert (born 1955), Belgian singer-songwriter
 Rezar (born 1994), Dutch/Albanian professional wrestler and former mixed martial artist
 Rhianna (born 1983), English singer
 Rhydian (born 1983), Welsh singer
 Rhymefest (born 1977), American hip hop artist
 Rhymson (born 1968), Tanzanian rapper
 Rhyno (aka Rhino; born 1975), American wrestler
 Ricky, Japanese singer, musician
 Rico, Scottish musician
 Ricochet (born 1988), American wrestler
 Ridan (born 1975), French singer
 Rihanna (born 1988), Barbadian singer
 Rikishi (aka Rikishi Phatu, Fatu; born 1965), Samoan American professional wrestler
 Rikki (born 1975), Japanese folk singer 
 Rikrok (born 1972), English singer
 Rim'K (born 1978), French-Algerian rapper
 Rinku (born 1988), Indian wrestler
 Riria (born 1993), Japanese actress
 Rita, Japanese voice actress, singer and lyricist
 Rita (born 1962), Iranian-born Israeli singer and actress
 Rivulets, American singer-songwriter
 Riya, Japanese singer
 RM (born 1994), South Korean rapper and record producer 
 Robert (born 1964), French singer-songwriter
 Robin (born 1998), Finnish singer and teen pop artist
 Robyn (born 1979), Swedish singer-songwriter
 Robyx (aka Savage), Italian singer, music producer, composer and businessman 
 Rocc (born 1979), Slovenian-born opera stage director, scenographer, dramaturge and performance artist
 Rock (aka Big Rock, The Rockness Monsta; born 1973), American rapper
 Rocko (born 1979), American rapper
 Rockwilder (born 1971), American hip hop and R&B record producer
 Rodriguez (born 1942), American folk musician
 Roesy, Irish singer-songwriter and model
 Rohff (born 1977), French rapper
 Rohini (born 1969), Indian actress, lyricist, screenwriter, voice actor and director
 Rojan, Iranian singer
 Rola (born 1990), Japanese fashion model and TV personality of Bangladeshi descent
 Roma (born 1984), Indian actress and model
 Romanthony, American musician
 Rome (born 1970), American R&B singer
 Romeo (born 1980), English rapper and MC
 Ronaldo (born 1976), Brazilian footballer and occasional actor
 Rosalía (born 1993), Spanish singer-songwriter
 Rosangela (born 1983), Puerto Rican singer
 Roscoe (born 1983), American rapper
 Rosé (born 1997), South Korean-Australian singer
 Rosemarie (born 1948), Filipino actress
Rosemary (born 1983), Canadian wrestler
 Roshan (1917–1967), Indian composer
 Roshana (born 1989), Canadian singer-songwriter
 Roshini, Indian Tamil playback singer
 Rosko, American singer-songwriter and producer
 Rossa (born 1978), Indonesian singer
Rowan (born 1981), American wrestler
 Rowetta (born 1966), English singer
 Rox (born 1988), English singer-songwriter
 Roya (born 1982), Azerbaijani singer
 Rozalla (born 1964), Zambian singer
 Ruby (born 1972), American pornographic actress
 Ruby (born 1981), Egyptian singer and actress
 Rufus (aka Zio Vittorio) 
 Ruggedman, Nigerian rapper
 Rukkus (born 1970), American wrestler
 Rumer, Pakistani-born British singer-songwriter
 RUNAGROUND, American electro-pop artist, producer, and singer-songwriter
 RuPaul (born 1960), American drag queen, talk show host, film and television performer
 Rupini (born 1969), Indian actress
 Rurutia, Japanese singer-songwriter
 Rusev (born 1985), Bulgarian wrestler
 Ruslana (born 1973), Ukrainian singer
 Russya (born 1968), Ukrainian singer and musician
 Ruudolf (born 1983), Finnish hip hop artist
 Ryback (born 1981), American wrestler
 Ryeowook (born 1987), South Korean singer-songwriter and occasional actor
 Ryō (born 1973), Japanese model, actress and singer
 Ryuichi (born 1970), Japanese singer-songwriter
 RZA (born 1969), American rapper, record producer, musician, actor, filmmaker and author

S

 Saandip (born 1978), Indian singer, actor and anchor
 Saara (born 1994), Finnish singer and TV host
 Sabah (1927–2014), Lebanese singer and actress
 Sabi (born 1988), American singer/songwriter and actress
 Sabian (born 1979), American wrestler
 Sable (born 1967), American model, actress and wrestler
 Sabrina (born 1936), English glamour model
 Sabrina (born 1968), Italian singer
 Sabrina (born 1969), Greek singer
 Sabrina (born 1983), Portuguese singer
 Sabrina (born 1989), Filipino singer
 Sabu (1924–1963), Indian-American actor 
 Sabu (born 1964), American wrestler
 Sachin (born 1957), Indian actor and producer
 Sadahzinia (born 1977), Greek rapper
 Sadayakko (1871–1946), Japanese geisha, actress and dancer
 Sade (born 1959), Nigerian-born British singer-songwriter
 Sadha (born 1984), Indian actress
 Sadhana (born 1941), Indian actress
 Sadiki (born 1971), Jamaican-American singer-songwriter and producer
 Saffron (born 1968), Nigerian-born British singer
 Safir, Danish singer, musician and composer
 Saga (born 1975), Swedish white nationalist singer-songwriter
 Sagarika (born 1970), Indian singer
 Sagat, American rapper and music producer
 Sahakdukht, Armenian composer
 Sahlene (born 1976), Swedish singer and actress
 Saigon (born 1977), American rapper
 Saikumar (born 1963), Indian actor
 Sailorine (born 1979), Norwegian singer-songwriter and musician
 Saima (born 1967), Pakistani actress
 Saindhavi (born 1989), Indian singer
 Saki (born 1870), English writer
 Sakura (born 1969), Japanese musician
 Salif (born 1982), French rapper
 Salomé (born 1943), Spanish singer
 Salome (born 1985), Iranian rapper
 Saloni (1950–2010), Pakistani film actress
 Salyu (born 1980), Japanese singer
 Sameksha (born 1985), Indian actress
 Sammie (born 1987), American singer and actor
 Sampaguita, Filipino singer
 Samsaya (born 1979), Indian-born Norwegian singer and actress
 Samsong (born 1974), Nigerian singer
 Samuthirakani (born 1973), Indian director
 Sandhya (born 1989), Indian actress
 Sandra (born 1962), German singer
 Sandrin, French composer
 Sandrine (born c. 1979), Australian singer-songwriter and musician
 Sandy (born 1983), Brazilian singer-songwriter, producer and actress
 Sandy (born 1986), Egyptian singer
 Sangeeta (born 1947), Pakistani actress and film director
 Sangeeta, Indian Telugu actress
 Sangeetha, Indian Tamil actress
 Sanghavi (born 1977), Indian actress
 Sangtar (born 1973), Indian singer-songwriter
 Sanjivani, Indian singer
 Sankaradi (1924–2001), Indian actor
 Sanrabb, Norwegian musician
 Santhanam (born 1980), Indian actor and producer
 Santhoshi (born 1987), Indian actress
 Santigold (born 1976), American singer-songwriter and producer
 Santo (1917–1984), Mexican wrestler and actor
 Sapho (born 1950), Moroccan-born French singer
 Sapphire (1935–1996), American wrestler
 Sapphire (born 1950), American author and performance poet
 Sarai (born 1981), American rapper and actress
 Sarangapani, Indian composer
 Sarbel (born 1986), British-Cypriot singer
 Sarika (born 1962), Indian actress
 Saritah, Australian singer-songwriter
 Saritha, Indian actress
 Sarp (born 1977), Turkish singer-songwriter and musician
 Sarray (born 1996), Japanese wrestler
 Sascha (born 1976), German pornographic actor
 Sash! (born 1970), German DJ and producer
 Sasha (born 1974), Jamaican dancehall recording artist and DJ
 Sasha (born 1979), Russian-born American singer, songwriter, performing artist, model, choreographer, and TV-video producer
 Sasha (born 1969), Welsh DJ and producer
 Sat (born 1975), French rapper
 Satchel (born 1970), American musician and songwriter
 Sathyaraj (born 1954), Indian actor
 Satomi' (born 1989), Japanese singer-songwriter
 Satsuki, Japanese musician
 Saud, Pakistani film and television actor/producer
 Saukrates (born 1977), Canadian rapper, singer and record producer
 Saurav (born 1985), Indian wrestler
 Savage (born 1981), New Zealander hip hop singer and rapper
 Savage (born 1956), Italian singer, record producer and composer
 Savannah (1970–1994), American pornographic actress
 Savitri (1937–1981), Indian actress, director and producer
 Scarface (born 1970), American rapper
 Scarlett (born 1991), American wrestler
 SCH (born 1993), French rapper of German descent
 Schmier (born 1966), German musician
 Scialpi (born 1962), Italian singer
 Scorcher, British MC and producer
 Scribe (born 1979), New Zealand rapper
 Seagram (1970–1996), American rapper
 Seal (born 1963), British singer
 Seamo (born 1975), Japanese rapper and hip-hop artist
 Sebastian, American rapper
 SebastiAn, French musician, composer, engineer and DJ
 Seema (born 1957), Indian actress
 Seetha, Indian actress
 Sefyu (born 1981), French rapper
 Sehun (born 1994), South Korean dancer and rapper
 Seka (born 1954), American pornographic actress
 Selan, American musician and singer-songwriter
 Selen (born 1966), Italian actress, TV presenter and pornographic actress
 Selena (1971–1995), American singer
 Selwyn (born 1982), South Africa-born Australian singer
 Sensei (born 1978), Mexican wrestler
 Senthil (born 1951), Indian actor
 Seohyun (born 1991), South Korean singer, dancer, model and actress
 Seorak (born 1981), South Korean singer and VJ
 September (born 1984), Swedish singer
 Seremoniamestari, Finnish rap artist
 Serena, American pornographic actress
 Serenity (born 1969), American pornographic actress
 Sergi (born 1971), Spanish retired footballer
 Seryoga (born 1976), Belarusian rapper
 Sesenne (1914–2010), Saint Lucian singer
 Seulgi (born 1994), South Korean singer
 Seungri (born 1990), Korean singer, dancer and actor
 Seven (born 1978), Swiss musician and singer
 Seven (born 1984), South Korean singer
 Séverine (born 1948), French singer
 Sha (born 1979), German singer
 Shaam (born 1978), Indian model and actor
 Shaan (born 1972), Indian singer and TV host
 Shabnam (born 1942), Pakistani actress
 Shad (1981–2020), American professional wrestler
 Shad (born 1982), Kenyan-born Canadian hip hop musician
 Shadia (born 1929), Egyptian actress and singer
 Shaggy (born 1968), Jamaica-born American singer and musician
 Shagrath (born 1976), Norwegian musician
 Shahid (born 1950), Pakistani actor
 Shahir (born 1988), Malaysian singer
 Shake (born 1950), Malaysian singer
 Shakeel (born 1938), Pakistani actor
 Shakeela (born 1973), Indian actress
 Shakila, Indian actress
 Shakila (born 1962), Iranian singer
 Shakira (born 1977), Colombian singer-songwriter
 Shamili (born 1987), Indian actress
 Shamir (born 1994), American musician
 Shammi (1929–2018), Indian actress
 Shammu (born 1992), Indian actress and model
 Shana (born 1972), American singer
 Shane (born 1969), American pornographic actress and director
 Shanice (born 1973), American singer-songwriter
 Shankar (born 1960), Indian actor and director
 Shanmugasundari (d. 2012), Indian actress
 Shannon (born 1958), American singer
 Shantel (born 1968), German DJ and record producer
 Sharada (born 1945), Indian actress
 Sharda, Indian singer
 Shareefa (born 1984), American singer
 Sharissa (born 1976), American singer
 Shark, American composer
 Sharkula, American rapper
 Shashikala (born 1933), Indian actress
 Shawnna (born 1979), American rapper
 Shazza (born 1967), Polish singer and occasional actress
 Sheamus (born 1978), Irish professional wrestler and actor
 Sheela (born 1945), Indian actress
 Sheila (born 1945), French singer
 Sheila (born 1984), German singer (folk and schlager music)
 Shèna (born 1971), English singer
 Shequida, Jamaican singer-songwriter and drag artist
 Sherin (born 1985), Indian actress and model
 Sherine (born 1980), Egyptian singer and actress
 Sherrick (1957–1999), American musician
 Shifty (born 1974), American singer
 Shiloh (born 1993), Canadian singer-songwriter
 Shinehead (born 1962), English-born Jamaican singer, rapper and DJ
 Shing02 (born 1975), Japanese hip hop recording artist and record producer
 Shinya (born 1970), Japanese musician and television personality
 Shocker (born 1971), Mexican wrestler
 Shockercito (born 1980), Mexican wrestler 
 Shona, French singer-songwriter
 Shontelle (born 1985), American singer
 Shoo (born 1981), Korean singer
 Shorty (born 1980), Croatian rapper
Shotzi (born 1992), American wrestler
 Shruti, Indian actress
 Shurik'n (born in 1966), French hip hop artist
 Shwayze (born 1985), American rapper
 Shyama (1935–2017), Indian actress
 Shy'm (born 1985), French singer
 Shyne (born 1978), Belizean rapper
 Shystie (born 1982), British rapper, songwriter and actress
 Sia (born 1975), Australian singer and songwriter
 Sibel (born 1987), Swedish singer
 Sibiraj (born 1982), Indian actor
 Siddique (born 1962), Indian film actor/producer, entrepreneur
 Sido (born 1980), German rapper
 Sie7e (born 1977), Puerto Rican singer
 Sieneke (born 1992), Dutch singer
 Sifow (born 1985), Japanese singer
 Sigga, Icelandic singer
 Sigrid, Norwegian singer
 Silenoz (born 1977), Norwegian guitarist
 Silvan (born 1935), Italian illusionist, writer and television personality
 Sim (1926–2009), French humorist, writer and comedian
 Simone (born 1962), American singer and actress
 Simone (born 1992), Danish pop singer
 Simon-Max (1852 to 1923), French tenor
 Simran (born 1976), Indian actress
 Sinbad (born 1956), American actor and comedian
 Singuila, French singer
 Sinik (born 1980), French rap artist
 Sinitta (born 1968), American-born British singer and actress
 Sirima (1964–1989), British singer
 Sirone (1940–2009), American musician and composer
 Sirusho (born 1987), Armenian singer
 Sisaundra, American singer-songwriter and producer
 Sisqó (born 1978), American R&B singer, songwriter, record producer, dancer and actor
 Sissel (born 1969), Norwegian singer
 Sita (born 1980), Dutch singer
 Sithara (born 1973), Indian actress
 Sivakumar (born 1939), Indian actor
 S!vas, Danish rapper of Iranian origin
 Sivuca (1930–2006), Brazilian musician
 Sizzla (aka Sizzla Kalonji)
 Škabo (born 1976), Serbian rapper and producer
 Skayde (born 1964), Mexican wrestler
 Skerik, American musician
 Skillz, American rapper
 Skin (born 1967), British singer
 Skinnyman (born 1974), English rapper
 Skitzo (born 1982), American rapper and hip hop producer
 Skrillex (born 1988), American DJ and singer-songwriter
 Skyla (born 1991), English singer
 Skyzoo (born 1982), American hip hop emcee
 Slaine (born 1977), American hip hop MC
 Slash (born 1965), British-born American guitarist
 Sliimy (born 1988), French musician
 Slim (born 1979), American R&B singer
 Slimmy, Portuguese singer
 Slug (born 1972), American rapper
 Smartzee (born 1980), French-American rapper
 Smita (born 1980), Indian singer, actress and TV anchor
 Smitty, American rapper
 Smooth (born 1970), American singer, rapper and actress
 Smudo (born 1968), German rapper
 Snakefinger (1949–1987), English musician
 Sneha (born 1981), Indian actress
 Snow (born 1969), Canadian singer-songwriter
 Snow (born 1985), Japanese singer
 Snowboy, British-Cuban musician
 Sobha (1962–1980), Indian actress
 Socalled, Canadian rapper and musician
 Sócrates (1954–2011), Brazilian footballer
 Sofia, Filipino singer
 Sofiane (born 1986), French rapper of Algerian descent
 Soko (born 1985), French singer and actress
 Sokół (born 1977), Polish emcee
 Sol (born 1988), American hip hop artist
 Solage, French composer
 Solbi (born 1984), South Korean singer and actress
 Solé (born 1973), American rapper
 Sole (born 1977), American hip hop artist
 Sóley, Icelandic singer, musician
 Solitair, Canadian hip hop MC and producer
 Solomon (1902–1988), British classical pianist
 Solomon (born 1987), American hip hop artist
 Somi (born 1979), American singer-songwriter
 Sommore (born 1966), American actress and comedian
 Sonam (born 1972), Indian actress
 Sonia (born 1971), English singer
 Sonim (born 1983), Japanese musician and singer-songwriter
 Sonique (born 1968), British DJ and singer
 Sonny (1935–1998), American singer and comedian
 Sonu, Indian actress
 Soopafly (born 1972), American hip hop producer and rapper
 Sooyoung (born 1990), South Korean singer and actress
 Sophie (1986–2021), Scottish music producer, singer, songwriter, and DJ
 Soprano (born 1979), French rapper
 Soraya (1969–2006), American singer-songwriter, guitarist and producer
 Sordello, Italian composer
 Sorkun, Spanish singer
 Sorn (born 1996), Thai singer
 Sosay (born 1980), American actress, model and wrestler
 Soundarya (1972–2004), Indian actress
 Sowelu (born 1982), Japanese singer
 Soyeon (born 1998), South Korean singer, rapper, songwriter
 Spagna (born 1954), Italian singer
 Spark (born 1992), English singer-songwriter
 Sparkle (born 1975), American singer
 Speak (born 1976), Hungarian rapper, model and actor
 Speech (born 1968), American rapper and musician
 Speedy (born 1979), Puerto Rican Reggaeton artist
 Spek, Canadian hip hop artist
 Spens (born 1975), Bulgarian hip hop artist
 Spike (born 1968), English singer-songwriter
 Spot (1951–2023), American record producer
 Spot (born 1987), American rapper
 Sputnik (born 1943), Norwegian singer and musician
 Squarepusher (born 1975), English musician
 Sreenath (1957–2010), Indian actor
 Sridevi (born 1963), Indian actress
 Srihari (born 1964), Indian actor
 Srikanth (born 1979), Indian actor
 Sriman, Indian actor
 Srinath, Indian actor and TV presenter
 Srinivas (born 1959), Indian singer
 Sripriya (born 1958), Indian actress
 Srividya (1953–2006), Indian actress
 Stacy (born 1990), Malaysian singer
 Stalley (born 1982), American rapper
 Stanislas (born 1972), French singer
 Starman (born 1974), Mexican wrestler
 Starrah (born 1990), American singer-songwriter and rapper
 Stelarc (born 1946), Cyprus-born Australian performance artist
 Stella (born 1980), Chinese singer, actress and model
 Stendhal (1783–1842), pen-name of the French writer Marie-Henri Beyle
 Steno (1915–1988), Italian film director, screenwriter and cinematographer
 Stephanie (born 1987), American-born Japanese singer, DJ and actress
 Stepz, Danish rapper
 Stig (born 1978), Finnish hip hop, R&B and country music singer
 Stigma, American wrestler
 Sting (born 1951), English musician
 Sting (born 1959), American wrestler
 Stoka (born 1981), Croatian rap artist
 Stoya (born 1986), American pornographic actress and model
 Striger, Canadian hip hop artist
 Stromae (born 1985), Belgian Rwandan singer songwriter
 Stylah, British rapper
 Styrofoam, Belgian singer and musician
 Suara, Japanese singer
 Suave (born 1966), American singer
 Subair (born 1962), Indian actor
 Subliminal (born 1979), Israeli hip hop artist and producer
 Subtitle (born 1978), American rapper and producer
 Sudeepa (born 1975), Indian actor, director and producer
 Sudhir (1921–1997), Pakistani actor 
 Suede, American jazz and blues singer
 Suga (born 1993), South Korean rapper and producer
 Suggs (born 1961), English singer-songwriter, musician, radio and television personality, and actor
 Sugizo (born 1969), Japanese musician, singer, songwriter, composer, record producer, actor, writer and activist 
 Suho (born 1991), South Korean singer and actor
 Sujatha (1952–2011), Indian actress
 Sukanya (born 1969), Indian actress
 Sukumaran (1948–1997), Indian actor
 Sulakshana, Indian actress
 Sulli (aka Sulli Choi)(born 1994), South Korean singer, actress and model
 Sulo, Swedish musician
 Sultan (born 1987), French Comorean hip hop artist and rapper
 Sumalatha (born 1963), Indian actress
 Suman (born 1959), Indian actor
 Sumanth (born 1975), Indian actor
 Sumathi (born 1964), Indian actress
 Sunaina (born 1987), Indian actress
 Sungmin (born 1986), South Korean singer and actor
 Sunil, Indian actor
 Sunjay (born 1993), English singer-songwriter and guitarist
 Sunny (born 1989), American-born South Korean singer, dancer and TV presenter
 Supastition, American hip hop artist
 Supernatural (aka Super Nat or MC Supernatural; born 1970), American rapper
 Supla (born 1966), Brazilian musician
 Suraiya (1929–2004), Indian singer and actress
 Susan (aka Suzan), Japanese singer
 Susan (1942–2004), Iranian singer
 Suthivelu (1947–2012), Indian actor and comedian
 Suvalakshmi (born 1977), Indian actress
 Suzy (born 1994), South Korean singer and actress
 Svala (born 1977), Icelandic singer-songwriter
 Swanee (born 1952), Scottish-born Australian singer
 Swapna, Indian actress
 Swarnalatha (1973–2010), Indian singer
 Swarnamalya, Indian actress and TV anchor
 Swingfly, American-born Swedish rapper and singer
 Syang (born 1970), Brazilian musician, writer and model
 Sybil (born 1965), American singer
 Sylvester (1947–1988), American singer-songwriter, and gay drag performer
 Sylvia (born 1956), American singer-songwriter
 Sylviac (1891–1974), French opera singer, diseuse, and actress; mother of actress Françoise Rosay
 Syreeta, American singer-songwriter
 Syria (born 1977), Italian singer
 SZA (born 1990), American singer and songwriter

T

 Tablo (born 1980), Korean Canadian hip hop artist, songwriter, lyricist, and author
 Taboo (born 1975), American rapper, singer, songwriter, actor and DJ
 Tabu (born 1971), Indian actress
 Taco (born 1955), Dutch singer
 Tado (1974–2014), Filipino comedian, actor, radio personality, businessman
 Taebin (born 1980), South Korean singer
 Taegoon (born 1986), South Korean singer and dancer
 Taeyang (born 1988), South Korean singer
 Taeyeon (born 1989), South Korean entertainer
 Taeyong (born 1995), South Korean entertainer
 Taffy (born 1963), American singer
 Tagaq (born 1975), Canadian singer
 Tahis (born 1988), Spanish singer
 Taiguara (1945–1996), Brazilian singer songwriter
 Taiji (1966–2011), Japanese musician and singer-songwriter
 Tainy (born 1989), Puerto Rican reggaeton producer
 Taiska (born 1955), Finnish singer
 Tajai (born 1975), American rapper and producer
 Tajči (born 1970), Croatian singer, TV show host, published author and blogger
 Tajiri (born 1970), Japanese wrestler
 Takaloo (born 1975), Iranian born British based boxer
 Takanohana (born 1972), Japanese sumo wrestler
 Takeoff (born 1994), American rapper
 Takfarinas (born 1958), French-Algerian singer-songwriter and musician
 Taktloss (born 1975), German rap artist
 Tal (born 1989), Israeli-French singer-songwriter and dancer
 Támar (born 1980), American singer
 Tamia (born 1975), Canadian-American singer-songwriter
 Tamina, American professional wrestler and actress
 Tamta (born 1981), Georgian singer
 Tanisha (born 1978), Indian actress
 Tank (born 1976), American singer-songwriter and record producer
 Tank (born 1977), German musician
 Tank (born 1982), Taiwanese singer-songwriter
 Tanuja (born 1943), Indian actress
 Tao (born 1993), Chinese rapper
 Tara (1944–2007), Indian actress
 Tara (born 1967), Indian actress
 Tara (born 1971), American wrestler
 Tarako (born 1960), Japanese voice actress
 Tarkan (born 1972), Turkish singer
 Tarja (born 1977), Finnish singer-songwriter
 Tarsem (born 1961), Indian-American director
 Tash (born 1971), American rapper
 Tataee (born 1976), Romanian record producer and rapper
 Tatanka (1961), American wrestler
 Tatiana (born 1968), Mexican singer
 Tau,  Polish rapper, vocalist, beatboxer and hip-hop producer
 Taz (akas: Taz Stereo Nation, Taz (Stereo Nation), Johnny Zee; born 1967), British singer, composer and actor
 Tazz (akas: the Tasmanian Devil, the Tazmaniac, Kid Krush; born 1967), American radio presenter, color commentator and professional wrestler
 T-Boz (born 1970), American singer-songwriter, actress, author, and executive producer
 Tede (born 1976), Polish rapper
 Teebs, American electronic producer and artist
 Tei (born 1983), South Korean singer
 Tejashree, Indian actress
 Tekitha, American singer and rapper
 Tela, American rapper
 Temperamento (born 1981), Puerto Rican-American rap artist
 Tenmon (born 1971), Japanese composer
 Teoman (born 1967), Turkish singer-songwriter
 Teru, Japanese guitarist
 Teru, Japanese singer
 Test, Canadian wrestler
 Tété (born 1975), Senegalese-born French singer-songwriter and musician
 Tetsuya (born 1969), Japanese singer, musician and composer
 Thalía (born 1971), Mexican singer and actress
 Thaman, Indian composer and actor
 Tharika, Indian actress
 The8, (born 1997) Chinese-born South Korean singer
 Thekra (1966–2003), Tunisian singer
 Thighpaulsandra (born 1958), Welsh experimental musician
 Thor, Filipino singer-songwriter and performer
 Thunderstick (born 1954), English drummer
 Thrust (born 1976), Canadian rapper
 Thulla (born 1968), Danish singer and composer
 T.I. (akas: T.I., Tip, TIP, T.I.P.; born 1980), American rapper and actor
 Tiê (born 1980), Brazilian singer-songwriter 
 Tiësto (born 1969), Dutch DJ and electronic music producer
 Tifa (born 1960), Bosnian singer
 Tiffany (born 1971), American singer
Tiffany (born 1985), American model, actress, stuntwoman, and wrestler
 Tiffany (born 1989), South Korean singer, dancer, model and television host 
 Tiga (born 1974), Canadian DJ and producer
 Tiggy, Danish singer
 Tim (born 1981), Korean-American singer
 Tilian (born 1987), American singer-songwriter and musician
 Timati (born 1983), Russian rapper
 Timaya (born 1976), Nigerian singer-songwriter
 Timbaland (born 1972), American producer, rapper,and singer  
 Timbuktu (born 1975), Swedish rapper and reggae artist
 Time (born 1985), American rapper
 Timz (born 1985), American rapper
 Tinashe (born 1993), American singer-songwriter, dancer, actress, and former model
 Tiririca (born 1965), Brazilian entertainer
 Titiyo (born 1967), Swedish pop singer-songwriter
 TJP, American wrestler
 TobyMac (aka tobyMac, TOBYMAC; born 1964), Christian hip hop artist, music producer, songwriter and author
 Togo (1905–1952), Filipino actor
 Tomatito (born 1958), Spanish composer and guitarist
 Tomato, American singer-songwriter and drummer
 Tomcraft (born 1975), German DJ and producer
 Tonedeff (born 1978), American rapper, producer and singer
 Tonéx (born 1975), American singer-songwriter, musician, dancer and producer
 Tongo (1957–2023), Peruvian singer and entertainer
 Tongolele (born 1932), Mexican/American vedette and actress 
 Tonia (born 1947), Belgian singer
 Tontxu (born 1973), Spanish singer-songwriter
 Tooji, Norwegian-Iranian singer, model and television host
 Topol (born 1935), Israeli actor, singer, writer and producer
 Toquinho (born 1946), Brazilian singer, musician and composer
 Torch (born 1971), German rapper
 Toshi (born 1965), Japanese singer-songwriter and musician
 Totò (1898–1967), Italian comedian, actor, writer, and singer-songwriter
 Touré (born 1971),novelist, music journalist, cultural critic and TV personality
 Toya (born 1983), singer
 Tozovac (born 1936), Serbian singer, musician and actor
 T-Pain (born 1984), American singer, songwriter, rapper, and record producer 
 TQ (born 1976), American singer
 Trae (born 1981), rapper
 Traxamillion (born 1979), rapper
 Treach (born 1970), American rapper and actor
 Trebor, French composer
 Trenyce (born 1980), American singer
 Tricarico (born 1971), Italian singer-songwriter
 Tricky (born 1968), English musician and actor
 Trina (born 1978), American rapper
 Trinere (born 1964), American singer, songwriter, and recording artist
 Tristen (born 1983), American singer
 Troja, American actress and singer
 Tsunku (born 1968), Japanese singer, songwriter and music producer
 Tucker (born 1990), American wrestler
 Tulisa (born 1988), English actress and singer 
 Tunisiano (born 1979), French rapper
 Tuotilo, Irish composer
 Turk, American rapper
 Tweet (born 1971), American singer-songwriter and guitarist
 Twiggy (born 1949), English model, actress, and singer
 Twink (born 1944), English drummer, singer-songwriter and actor
 Twinkle (1948-2015), British pop singer
 Twista (formerly Tung Twista; born 1973), American rapper
 Ty (1972-2020), British hip hop artist
 Tyagaraja (1767–1847), Indian composer
 Tyga (born 1989), American hip hop recording artist
 Tyla (born 1960), English singer-songwriter and guitarist
 Tylea, Australian singer-songwriter
 Tyssem (born 1984), French singer-songwriter
 Tzuki (born 1974), Mexican wrestler
 Tzuyu (born 1999), Taiwanese singer

U

 Ua (born 1972), Japanese singer-songwriter, producer and actress
 Uee (born 1988), South Korean singer, dancer and actress
 Uffie (born 1987), American singer-songwriter, rapper, DJ, and fashion designer
 U-God (born 1970), American rapper 
 U-Know (akas: U-Know, U-Know Yunho; born 1986), South Korean singer, actor, and a member of the pop duo TVXQ  
 UFO (born 1981), Danish singer and rapper
 Umashree (born 1957), Indian actress
 Uniikki (born 1981), Finnish artist
 Upendra (born 1967), Indian actor and director
 Urbanus (born 1949), Belgian comedian, actor and singer
 Urna (born 1969), Mongolian singer and musician
 U-Roy (born 1942), Jamaican vocalist 
 Urvashi (born 1966), Indian actress
 Usher (born 1978), American singer and dancer
 U$O (born 1981), Danish rapper

V

 V (born 1995), South Korean singer and actor
 Vadivelu (born 1960), Indian actor and singer
 Vaï (born 1979), Moroccan-born Canadian rapper 
 Vaiyapuri (born 1968), Indian comedian and actor
 Vajramuni (1944–2006), Indian actor
 Vakill (born 1975), American rapper
 Valdy (born 1945), Canadian singer-songwriter and musician
 Valensia (born 1971), Dutch singer, composer, producer and musician
 Valeriya (born 1968), Russian singer
 Valete, Portuguese hip hop artist
 Valtònyc (born 1993), Spanish rapper
 Vamba (1858–1920), Italian author
 Vampira (1922–2008), Finnish-American actress and television personality
 Vampiro (born 1967), Canadian professional wrestler
 Vangelis (born 1943), Greek composer
 Vanity (born 1959), Canadian entertainer
 Vanna (born 1970), Croatian singer
 Vanusa (born 1947), Brazilian singer
 VanVelzen (born 1978), Dutch singer-songwriter
 Vassy, Greek-Australian singer-songwriter
 Veena (1926–2004), Indian actress
 Vega (born 1979), Spanish singer-songwriter
 Velvet (born 1975), Swedish singer
 Venkatesh (born 1960), Indian film actor
 Vera-Ellen (1921–1981), American actress and dancer
 Veronica (born 1974), American dance music singer and stage actress
 Versatile, American record producer, songwriter, and remixer
 Vertexguy (born 1979), American musician
 Vidyasagar (born 1963), Indian music director and composer
 Vignesh, Indian actor
 Vijay (born 1974), Tamil actor and playback singer 
 Vijayakanth (born 1952), Indian actor
 Vijayakumar (born 1943), Tamil film actor and politician
 Vijayaraghavan (born 1951), Malaysia-born Indian film actor
 Vijayashanti (born 1964), Indian actress
 Vijayasree, Indian actress
 Vikranth, Indian actor
 Viktor (born 1980), Canadian professional wrestler
 Viktoria (born 1970), Filipino singer
 Viktorija (born 1958), Serbian singer
 Vinayan, Indian director and producer, mainly of Malayalam movies
 Vincent (born 1980), Swedish singer
 Vineeth (born 1969), Indian actor and dancer
 Vinni (born 1976), Norwegian musician and hip hop artist
 Violetta, German-American singer and performer
 Viper (actress) (1959–2010), American pornographic actress 
 Virus (born 1968), Mexican wrestler
 Vishnuvardhan (1950–2009), Indian film actor
 Vitaa (born 1983), French singer
 Vitas (born 1979), Russian singer-songwriter and actor
 Vitorino (born 1942), Portuguese singer-songwriter
 Viva (born 1938), American actress, writer and Warhol superstar 
 Vivek (1961–2021), Indian actor and comedian
 Voltaire (born 1967), Cuban-born American musician
 Vyjayanthimala (born 1936), Indian actress, singer, dancer,  choreographer, and parliamentarian 
 Vysakh, Indian film director

W

 Waajeed, American rapper and producer
 Wafande, Danish reggae and soul singer and songwriter
 Wale (born 1984), American hip hop artist
 Wallen (born 1978), French singer
 Walter (born 1987), Austrian wrestler
 Wande (born 1996), Nigerian-American hip hop artist
 Wanderléa (born 1946), Brazilian singer
 Wando (1945–2012), Brazilian singer-songwriter
 Wanessa (born 1982), Brazilian singer-songwriter
 Wanz (aka TeeWanz; born 1961), American singer, songwriter, and rapper
 Warda sometimes full name as Warda Al-Jazairia (1939–2012), Algerian singer 
 Warrior (1957–2014), American wrestler
 Wax (born 1976), South Korean singer
 Wayna, Ethiopian-born American R&B/soul singer and songwriter
 Webbie (born 1985), American rapper
 Weegee (1899–1968), American photojournalist and filmmaker
 Wendy (born 1994), South Korean singer
 Wess (1945–2009), American-born Italian singer
 Wheesung (born 1982), South Korean singer
 Whigfield (born 1970), Danish singer
 Whitton, American singer-songwriter
 Wildchild, American rapper
 Wiley (born 1979), British MC and music producer
 Wing, Hong Kong-born New Zealand singer and musician
 Winta (born 1984), Norwegian singer-songwriter
 Wise (born 1979), Japanese hip hop musician
 Witchdoctor (born 1975), American rapper, musician and producer
 Wolfgang (born 1986), Scottish professional wrestler
 Woohee (1991), South Korean singer, songwriter and actress
 Woodkid (born 1983), French music video director, graphic designer and singer-songwriter
 Wordburglar, Canadian hip hop artist
 Wordplay (born 1974), British musician and actor
 Wordsworth, American hip-hop musician and emcee
 Wrabel (born 1989), American singer
 Wreckonize (born 1983), American rapper 
 Wunmi, Nigerian-British singer and dancer
 Würzel (1949-2011), English musician
 Wuv (born 1972), American musician 
 Wynonna (born 1964), American country singer

X

 Xandee (born 1978), Belgian singer
 Xander (born 1988), Danish pop singer and songwriter
 Xander (born 1985), Dutch singer, songwriter
 Xatar (born 1982), Kurdish-born German rapper
 Xavier (born 1977), American professional wrestler
 Xenia (born 1994), American singer
 Xiah (born 1986), South Korean singer-songwriter
 Xiumin (born 1990), South Korean singer
 Xiyeon (born 2000), South Korean singer
 Xonia (born 1989), Australian singer-songwriter, actress and dancer
 X-Pac (born 1972), American professional wrestler
 xSDTRK (born 1988), Canadian writer, producer and artist
 Xuxa (born 1963), Brazilian TV hostess, actress and singer
 XXXTentacion (1998–2018), American rapper, singer, and songwriter
 Xzibit (born 1974), American rapper, actor and television personality

Y

 Yahir (born 1979), Mexican singer and actor
 Yaire (born 1977), Puerto Rican singer-songwriter
 Yaiya (born 1990), Swedish artist, songwriter and actor
 Yameen, American hip hop producer
 Yan, English singer-songwriter and musician
 Yana (born 1931), British singer
 Yangpa (born 1979), South Korean singer
 Yanni (born 1954), Greek-American musician
 Yanni (born 1978), Filipino singer and musician
 Yara (born 1983), Lebanese singer
 Yared (505–571), Ethiopian musician
 Yas (born 1982), Iranian rapper
 Yasin (born 1998), Swedish rapper
 Yasmine (1972–2009), Belgian singer and TV presenter
 Yazz (born 1960), British singer and model
 Yebin (born 1997), South Korean singer-songwriter and composer
 Yehonathan (born 1977), Israeli singer
 Yellowman (born 1956), Jamaican musician, songwriter and DJ
 Yelawolf (born 1979), American rapper
 Yepha (born 1983), Danish, singer, rapper and hip hop artist
 YG (born 1990), American rapper
 Yiruma (born 1978), South Korean pianist and composer
 Yoav (born 1979), Israeli singer-songwriter and musician
 Yohio (born 1995), Japanese-Swedish singer
 Yokozuna (1966–2000), American wrestler
 Yoona (born 1990), South Korean singer, actress, model and dancer
 Yoshika (born 1983), Japanese singer
 Yoshiki (born 1965), Japanese musician, songwriter and record producer
 You (born 1964), Japanese model, TV personality, singer and actress
 Youddiph (born 1973), Russian singer
 Younha (born 1988), South Korean singer
 Yousra (born 1950), Egyptian actress and singer
 Yovanna (born 1940), Greek singer
 Yo-Yo (born 1971), rapper, songwriter, actress, entrepreneur
 Yozuca, Japanese singer
 Yui (born 1987), Japanese musician and actress
 Yuka (born 1970), Japanese singer
 Yukana (born 1975), Japanese voice actress and singer
 yukihiro (born 1968), Japanese musician
 Yukmouth (born 1974), rapper
 Yūmao (born 1980), Japanese singer-songwriter
 Yuna (born 1986), Malaysian singer-songwriter
 Yungun (aka Essa), British hip-hop artist 
yuri (born 1977), Japanese singer (Vocalist of m.o.v.e.)
 Yuri (born 1976), South Korean pop singer (Member of Girls' Generation)
 Yuri (born 1964), Mexican singer and actress
 Yuria, Japanese singer and guitarist
 Yuridia (born 1986), Mexican singer
 Yusa, Cuban singer-songwriter
 Yuusuke (born 1985), Japanese singer

Z

 Zacarias (1934–1990), Brazilian actor and comedian
 Zahara (born 1988), South African singer-songwriter
 Zaho (born 1980), Algerian-Canadian singer
 Zalon (born 1983), British pop singer, songwriter, and record producer
 Zamfir (born 1941), Romanian pan-flute player
 Zara (born 1976), Turkish singer and actress
 Zara (born 1983), Russian pop singer and actress
 Zarif, British singer-songwriter
 Zarsanga (born 1946), Pakistani singer
 Zayn (born 1993), English singer and songwriter
 Zaytoven (born 1980), American record producer, DJ, and pianist
 Zaz (born 1980), French singer
 Zazie (born 1964), French singer-songwriter
 Zeba (born 1945), Pakistani actress
 Zedd (born 1989), Russian-German DJ, record producer and songwriter
 Zeebee (born 1965), German-born Austrian singer-songwriter and producer
 Zeebra (born 1971), Japanese hip hop artist
 Zemfira (born 1976), Tatar Russian singer
 Zendaya (born 1996), American actress and singer
 Zia (born 1986), South Korean singer
 Zico (born 1992), South Korean singer-songwriter, rapper and music producer
 Zifou (born 1992), French rapper of Moroccan origin
 Zíngaro (born 1949), Spanish singer
 Zoë (born 1969), British singer-songwriter
 Zombo (1979–2008), South African singer-songwriter and music producer
 Zouzou (born 1943), Algerian model, actress and singer
 Zoxea (born 1974), French rapper
 Zucchero (born 1955), Italian singer
 Zulema (1947–2013), American singer-songwriter

2

 2pac (1971–1996), American rapper

See also
 List of legally mononymous people
 List of pseudonyms
 List of stage names
 Mononymous person
 Pen name
 Ring name
 Stage name

References 

One name, List of people known by